

M

M: (1931, 1951, 2007, 2018 Israeli & 2018 Finnish)
M. Butterfly (1993)
M3GAN (2022)

Ma

Ma (2019)
Ma 6-T va crack-er (1997)
Ma Rainey's Black Bottom (2020)
Ma Vie en Rose (1997)
Ma-Mha (2007)

Maa

Maa: (1952, 1959, 1976 & 1991)
Maa Aavida Collector (1996)
Maa Abbayi (2017)
Maa Alludu Very Good (2003)
Maa Annayya (2000)
Maa Aur Mamta (1970)
Maa Ayana Chanti Pilladu (2008)
Maa Baap (1944)
Maa Baap Ki Laaj (1946)
Maa Babu (1960)
Maa Bahen Aur Biwi (1974)
Maa Beti (1987)
Maa Bhoomi (1979)
Maa Daivam (1976)
Maa Gopi (1954)
Maa Iddari Katha (1977)
Maa Inti Mahalakshmi (1959)
Maa Inti Premayanam (1983)
Maa Ka Aanchal (1970)
Maa Kasam: (1985 & 1999)
Maa Madurai (2007)
Maa Nanna Chiranjeevi (2010)
Maa Nannaku Pelli (1997)
Maa Ooru (1987)
Maa Pallelo Gopaludu (1985)
Maa Pelliki Randi (2001)
Maa Tujhe Salaam (2018)
Maa Tujhhe Salaam (2002)
Maa Vintha Gaadha Vinuma (2020)
Maa Voori Magadu (1987)
Maach Mishti & More (2013)
Maacher Jhol: (2017 feature & 2017 short)
Maachis (1996)
Maad Dad (2013)
Maadi Veettu Ezhai (1981)
Maadi Veettu Mappilai (1967)
Maaf, Saya Menghamili Istri Anda (2007)
Maafa 21 (2009)
Maafeh Neiy (2010)
Maaficha Sakshidar (1986)
Maagiya Kanasu (1977)
Maahir (1996)
Maalai Naerathu Mayakkam (2016)
Maalai Pozhudhin Mayakathilaey (2012)
Maalai Sooda Vaa (1975)
Maalaiyitta Mangai (1958)
Maalamaal (1988)
Maalayogam (1990)
Maalgudi Days (2016)
Maalik: (1972 & 2016)
Maalika Paniyunnavar (1979)
Maamaankam (1979)
Maaman Magal: (1955 & 1995)
Maamanitham (2022)
Maami (2011)
Maamiyar Veedu (1993)
Maamui (2019)
Maan Apmaan (1979)
Maan Gaye Mughal-e-Azam (2008)
Maan Gaye Ustaad (1981)
Maan Jao Naa (2018)
Maan Karate (2014)
Maan Maryada (1991)
Maanaadu (2021)
Maanagara Kaaval (1991)
Maanagaram (2017)
Maanasa Sarovara (1982)
Maanasaandarapetta Yezdi (2016)
Maanasamrakshanam (1945)
Maanasaveena (1976)
Maanaseega Kadhal (1999)
Maanasthan (2004)
Maanavan (1970)
Maanavan Ninaithal (2008)
Maanaya (2019)
Maanbumigu Maanavan (1996)
Maane Thaene Paeye (2020)
Maang Bharo Sajana (1980)
Maanga (2015)
Maangamizi: The Ancient One (2001)
Maanik (2019)
Maanikka Thottil (1974)
Maanikya (2014)
Maanikyan (2005)
Maanja Velu (2010)
Maanmizhiyaal (1990)
Maanthrikam (1995)
Maanyanmar (1992)
Maappillai (1952)
Maar Dhaad (1988)
Maara (2021)
Maaran (2002)
Maarconi Mathaai (2019)
Maarg (1992)
Maari (2015)
Maari 2 (2018)
Maaro (2011)
Maasi (2012)
Maasilamani (2009)
Maasthi Gudi (2017)
Maathaad Maathaadu Mallige (2007)
Maathangal Ezhu (1993)
Maathi Yosi (2010)
Maathina Malla (1998)
Maathu Tappada Maga (1978)
Maati (2018)
Maati Balidan Ki (1986)
Maati Maay (2007)
Maato Pettukoku (1995)
Maatr (2007)
Maattoly (1978)
Maattrraan (2012)
Maavari Manchitanam (1979)
Maaveeran (1986)
Maaveeran Kittu (2016)
Maavichiguru (1996)
Maavidaakulu (1998)
Maaya: (1972 & 2014)
Maaya Rambha (1950)
Maayai (2013)
Maayajaalam (2006)
Maayan (2001)
Maayanadhi (2020)
Maayavan (2017)
Maayavi (2005)
Maayi (2000)
Maayon (2022)
Maazee (2000)
Maazii (2013)

Mab

Mabata Bata (2017)
Mabel, Fatty and the Law (1915)
Mabel and Fatty Viewing the World's Fair at San Francisco (1915)
Mabel and Fatty's Married Life (1915)
Mabel and Fatty's Simple Life (1915)
Mabel and Fatty's Wash Day (1915)
Mabel at the Wheel (1914)
Mabel's Adventures (1912)
Mabel's Awful Mistakes (1913)
Mabel's Blunder (1914)
Mabel's Busy Day (1914)
Mabel's Dramatic Career (1913)
Mabel's Latest Prank (1914)
Mabel's Lovers (1912)
Mabel's Married Life (1914)
Mabel's Nerve (1914)
Mabel's New Hero (1913)
Mabel's New Job (1914)
Mabel's Stormy Love Affair (1914)
Mabel's Strange Predicament (1914)
Mabel's Wilful Way (1915)
Mabo (2012 TV)
Mabo: Life of an Island Man (1997)
Maborosi (1997)
Mabudachi (2001)
Mabul (2010)

Mac

Mac (1992)
Mac & Devin Go to High School (2012)
Mac and Me (1988)
Macabre: (1958, 1980 & 2009)
Macadam Stories (2015)
Macadam Tribu (1996)
The Macaluso Sisters (2020)
Macao (1952)
Macario (1960)
Macario Against Zagomar (1944)
Macaroni (1985)
MacArthur (1977)
MacArthur's Children (1984)
Macbeth: (1908, 1909 French, 1909 Italian, 1911, 1913, 1915, 1916, 1922, 1948, 1960 American, 1960 Australian, 1965 TV, 1971, 1982, 1987, 2006, 2010 TV, 2015, 2021 & unreleased)
Macedonian Blood Wedding (1967)
MacGruber (2010)
Mach 2 (2001)
Machan (2008)
Machete (2010)
Machete Kills (2013)
Machhli Jal Ki Rani Hai (2014)
Machi (2004)
Machine: (2006 & 2017)
The Machine (2013)
The Machine Age (1977 TV)
The Machine Girl (2008)
Machine Gun Mama (1944)
Machine Gun McCain (1969)
Machine Gun Molly (2004)
Machine Gun Preacher (2011)
Machine-Gun Kelly (1958)
The Machine to Kill Bad People (1952)
Machines (2016)
The Machinist (2004)
The Machinists (2012)
Macho (2016)
Macho Callahan (1970)
Macho Dancer (1988)
Macho like Me (2010)
Macho Mustanaa (2012)
Machuca (2004)
Macintyre's X-Ray Film (1896)
Maciste the Athlete (1918)
Maciste, the Avenger of the Mayans (1965)
Maciste and the Chinese Chest (1923)
Maciste alla corte del Gran Khan (1961)
Maciste and the Javanese (1922)
Maciste in King Solomon's Mines (1964)
Maciste in the Lion's Cage (1926)
Maciste the Policeman (1918)
Maciste and Prisoner 51 (1923)
Maciste against the Sheik (1926)
Maciste and the Silver King's Daughter (1922)
Maciste on Vacation (1921)
Maciste's American Nephew (1924)
The Mack (1973)
Mack at It Again (1914)
Mack the Knife: (1989 & 1995)
Mackenna's Gold (1969)
The Mackintosh Man (1973)
Mackintosh and T.J. (1975)
Maclovia (1948)
The Macomber Affair (1946)
Macon County Line (1974)
Macondo (2014)
Macross: Do You Remember Love? (1984)
Macross FB 7: Ore no Uta o Kike! (2012)
Macu, The Policeman's Woman (1987)
Macumba Love (1960)
Macunaíma (1969)
Macushla (1937)

Mad

Mad About Dance (2014)
Mad About Mambo (2000)
Mad About Men (1954)
Mad About Music (1938)
Mad About Opera (1948)
The Mad Adventures of Rabbi Jacob (1973)
Mad Animals (1939)
Mad Bastards (2011)
Mad Bomber in Love (1992)
Mad Buddies (2012)
Mad City (1997)
Mad Cowgirl (2006)
Mad Detective (2007)
Mad Dog and the Butcher (2019)
Mad Dog Coll: (1961 & 1992)
Mad Dog and Glory (1993)
Mad Dog Labine (2018)
Mad Dog Morgan (1976)
Mad Dog Time (1996)
Mad Dogs & Englishmen (1971)
Mad Dogs and Englishmen (1995)
Mad Families (2017)
The Mad Fox (1962)
Mad Foxes (1981)
Mad Genius (2017)
The Mad Ghoul (1943)
Mad God (2021)
Mad as Hell (2014)
Mad Holiday (1936)
Mad Hot Ballroom (2005)
Mad Hour (1928)
Mad Love: (1935, 1995, 2001 & 2015)
The Mad Magician (1954)
Mad as a Mars Hare (1963)
Mad Max series:
Mad Max (1979)
Mad Max 2: The Road Warrior (1981)
Mad Max Beyond Thunderdome (1985)
Mad Max: Fury Road (2015)
The Mad Miss Manton (1938)
Mad Mom (2019)
Mad Money (2008)
Mad Monkey Kung Fu (1979)
The Mad Monk (1993)
The Mad Monster (1942)
Mad Monster Party? (1969)
Mad at the Moon (1992)
Mad to Be Normal (2017)
The Mad Racer (1926)
Mad Ship (2012)
The Mad Woman's Ball (2021)
Mad World (2016)
Mad Youth (1940)
Madaalasa (1978)
Madaari (2016)
Madadayo (1993)
Madadgaar (1987)
Madagascar (1994)
Madagascar series:
Madagascar (2005)
Madagascar: Escape 2 Africa (2008)
Madagascar 3: Europe's Most Wanted (2012)
Madagascar, a Journey Diary (2009)
Madagascar Skin (1995)
Madai Thiranthu (unreleased)
Madakkayathra (1985)
Madalena (1960)
Madam (1994)
Madam Chief Minister (2021)
Madam Oh (1965)
Madam Rani (1995)
Madam Satan (1930)
Madam Temptation (1948)
Madam Who? (1918)
Madam X (1994)
Madam Yankelova's Fine Literature Club (2017)
Madamakki (2016)
Madame: (1961 & 2017)
Madame Baptiste (1974)
Madame du Barry: (1928 & 1954)
Madame Behave (1925)
Madame Bluebeard (1931)
Madame Bo-Peep (1917)
Madame Bovary: (1934, 1937, 1947, 1949, 1969, 1991 & 2014)
Madame Butterfly: (1915, 1932, 1954 & 1995)
Madame Butterfly's Illusion (1940)
Madame Courage (2015)
Madame Curie (1943)
Madame Dares an Escapade (1927)
Madame Double X (1914)
Madame Du Barry: (1917 & 1934)
Madame DuBarry (1919)
Madame Édouard (2004)
Madame et son flirt (1946)
Madame Freedom (1956)
Madame Golvery (1923)
Madame Guillotine: (1916 & 1931)
Madame and Her Niece (1969)
Madame Hyde (2017)
Madame Irma (2006)
Madame Jealousy (1918)
Madame de La Pommeraye's Intrigues (1922)
Madame Louise (1951)
Madame Lu (1929)
Madame Makes Her Exit (1932)
Madamigella di Maupin (1966)
Madame Mystery (1926)
Madame besøker Oslo (1927)
Madame Peacock (1920)
Madame Pinkette & Co (1917)
Madame Pompadour: (1927 & 1931)
Madame la Presidente (1916)
Madame Racketeer (1932)
Madame Récamier: (1920 & 1928)
Madame Rosa (1977)
Madame Sans-Gêne: (1911 & 1925)
Madame Satã (2002)
Madame Sherry (1917)
Madame Sin (1972)
Madame Sphinx (1918)
Madame Spy: (1918, 1934 & 1942)
Madame Sousatzka (1988)
Madame Tutli-Putli (2007)
Madame Wants No Children: (1926 & 1933)
Madame Web (2024)
Madame X: (1916, 1920, 1929, 1937, 1954, 1955, 1966 & 1981 TV)
Madampi (2008)
Madana (2006)
Madana Gopaludu (1987)
Madana Kama Rajan (1941)
Madana Mohini (1953)
Madanolsavam (1978)
Madappura (1962)
Madatha Kaja (2011)
Madatharuvi (1967)
Mädchen in Uniform (1931)
Madcap Mabel (2010)
Madcap Madge (1917)
Maddalena (1954)
Maddalena, Zero for Conduct (1940)
The Maddening (1995)
Made: (1972 & 2001)
Made in America: (1993 & 2013)
Made in Argentina (1987)
Made in Ash (2012)
Made in Australia (2013)
Made in Bangladesh: (2007 & 2019)
Made on Broadway (1933)
Made in Britain (1982)
Made in China: (2009, 2014 & 2019)
Made in Cleveland (2013)
Made in Dagenham (2010)
Made for Each Other: (1939, 1953, 1971 & 2009)
Made in France (2015)
Made in Heart (2014)
Made in Heaven: (1921, 1952 & 1987)
Made in Hong Kong (1997)
Made of Honor (2008)
Made in Hungaria (2010)
Made in Israel (2001)
Made in Italy: (1965 & 2020)
Made in Japan: Kora! (2011)
Made in L.A. (2007)
Made for Love (1926)
Made in Mauritius (2009)
Made Men (1999)
Made in Milan (1990)
Made in Paris (1966)
Made in Romania (2010)
Made in Sheffield (2002)
Made in Sweden (1969)
Made in U.S.A.: (1966 & 1987)
Made in YU (2005)
Madea series:
Diary of a Mad Black Woman (2005)
Madea's Family Reunion (2006)
Meet the Browns (2008)
Madea Goes to Jail (2009)
I Can Do Bad All by Myself (2009)
Madea's Big Happy Family (2011)
Madea's Witness Protection (2012)
A Madea Christmas (2013)
Madea's Tough Love (2015)
Boo! A Madea Halloween (2016)
Boo 2! A Madea Halloween (2017)
A Madea Family Funeral (2019)
A Madea Homecoming (2022)
Madeinusa (2005)
Madeleine: (1919, 1950 & 2003)
Madeline (1998)
Madeline: Lost in Paris (1999)
Madeline's Madeline (2018)
Mademoiselle: (1966 & 2001)
Mademoiselle from Armentières (1926)
Mademoiselle Chiffon (1919)
Mademoiselle Fifi (1944)
Mademoiselle Gobete (1952)
Mademoiselle Has Fun (1948)
Mademoiselle Josette, My Woman: (1926, 1933 & 1950)
Mademoiselle ma mère (1937)
Mademoiselle Midnight (1924)
Mademoiselle Modiste (1926)
Mademoiselle Mozart (1935)
Mademoiselle Parley Voo (1928)
Mademoiselle Swing (1942)
Madesha (2008)
Madha (2019)
Madha Gaja Raja (unreleased)
Madha Mathu Manasi (2016)
Madha Yaanai Koottam (2013)
Madhanamala (1947)
Madhavayya Gari Manavadu (1992)
Madhaveeyam (2019)
Madhavi (2009)
Madhavikutty (1973)
Madhosh: (1951, 1974 & 1994)
Madhoshi (2004)
Madhouse: (1974, 1981, 1990 & 2004)
Madhu: (1959 & 2006)
Madhu Chandra (1979)
Madhu Malathi (1966)
Madhu Malti (1978)
Madhubala (1950)
Madhubana Kadai (2012)
Madhuchandralekha (2006)
Madhumasam (2007)
Madhumati: (1958, 2011 & 2013)
Madhur Milan (2000)
Madhura Naranga (2015)
Madhura Raja (2019)
Madhura Sangama (1978)
Madhura Swapanam (1977)
Madhuraiyai Meetta Sundharapandiyan (1978)
Madhuram Thirumadhuram (1976)
Madhuranombarakattu (2000)
Madhurappathinezhu (1975)
Madhurey (2004)
Madhuri: (1989 & 2018)
Madhurikkunna Raathri (1978)
Madhusudan (1941)
Madhuve Madu Tamashe Nodu (1986)
Madhuvidhu (1970)
Madhuvidhu Theerum Mumbe (1985)
Madhvacharya (1986)
Madhya Venal (2009)
Madhyamvarg: The Middle Class (2014)
Madhyanam Hathya (2004)
Madicken på Junibacken (1980)
Madigan (1968)
Madigan's Millions (1969)
Madipu (2017)
Madirasi (2012)
Madison (2001)
Madison Avenue (1961)
Madison County (2011)
Madison Square Garden (1932)
Madly Bangalee (2009)
Madly in Love: (1943 & 1981)
Madman (1982)
The Madman (1911)
Madman and Vagabond (1946)
Madman at War (1985)
Madmast Barkhaa (2015)
Madness: (1919, 1980, 1992 & 2010)
Madness of the Heart (1949)
The Madness of King George (1994)
Madness of Love (1953)
Madness for Love (1948)
Madness in the Method (2019)
Madness Rules (1947)
Madness of Youth (1923)
Mado (1976)
Mado, Hold for Pick Up (1990)
Madol Duwa (1976)
Madonna: (1999 & 2015)
Madonna of Avenue A (1929)
Madonna in Chains (1949)
Madonna of the Desert (1948)
Madonna: Innocence Lost (1994 TV)
Madonna of the Seven Moons (1945)
Madonna of the Sleeping Cars: (1928 & 1955)
Madonna of the Storm (1913)
Madonna of the Streets: (1924 & 1930)
Madonna: Truth or Dare (1991)
Madonna's Pig (2011)
Madonnas and Men (1920)
Madras (2014)
Madras Cafe (2013)
Madras Mail (1936)
Madras to Pondicherry (1966)
Madrasa (2013)
Madrasapattinam (2010)
Madrasi (2006)
Madrasile Mon (1982)
Madrasta (1996)
Madraza (2017)
Madre (2016)
Madre Alegría (1950)
Madrid, 1987 (2011)
Madrid Carnival (1941)
Madron (1970)
Madrugada (1957)
Madtown (2016)
Madu Tiga (1964)
Madunnella (1948)
Madura Veeran (2018)
Madurai Meenakshi (1993)
Madurai Ponnu Chennai Paiyan (2008)
Madurai Sambavam (2009)
Madurai Veeran: (1956 & 2007)
Madurai Veeran Enga Saami (1990)
Maduve Aagona Baa (2001)
Maduve Madi Nodu (1965)
Maduve Maduve Maduve (1969)
Maduve Mane (2011)
Maduveya Mamatheya Kareyole (2016)
The Madwoman of Chaillot (1969)

Mae-Mag

Mae West (1982 TV)
Maedeli la brèche (1980)
Maelström (2000)
Maestra (2011)
Maestro: (2005 & 2014)
Maestro! (2015)
Maestro Levita (1938)
Maestro Thief (1994)
Maestros (2000)
Mafia: (1993, 1996 & 2002)
Mafia! (1998)
Mafia Connection (1970)
Mafia Inc. (2019)
Mafia vs. Ninja (1984)
Mafia Raaj (1998)
Mafioso (1962)
The Mafu Cage (1978)
Mág (1988)
Maga Maharaju (1983)
Maga Mommaga (1974)
Maga Rayudu (1994)
Magaadu: (1976 & 1990)
Magadheera (2009)
Magadheerudu (1986)
Magalir Mattum: (1994 & 2017)
Magalirkkaga (2000)
Magallanes (2014)
Magandang Hatinggabi (1998)
Magane En Marumagane (2010)
Magane Magane (1982)
Maganey Kel (1965)
Magaraasi (1967)
Magathala Nattu Mary (1957)
Magda (1917)
Magda Expelled (1938)
Magdalena (1955)
The Magdalene Sisters (2002)
Magdana's Donkey (1956)
Mage Wam Atha (2002)
Mage Yalu Malu (2016)
Magenta (1996)
The Maggie (1954)
Maggie (2015)
Maggie's Christmas Miracle (2017)
Maggie's First False Step (1917)
Maggie's Plan (2015)
Magi (2016)
Magia Russica (2004)
Magic: (1917, 1978 & 2021)
The Magic 7 (2005) (TV)
Magic Ajji (2005)
Magic Bay (2002)
Magic Beyond Words (2011)
Magic & Bird: A Courtship of Rivals (2010)
The Magic Box (1951)
Magic Boy (1959)
Magic Camp (2020)
Magic Card (2015)
Magic Carpet Ride (2005)
The Magic Christian (1969)
Magic City Memoirs (2011)
The Magic Cloak of Oz (1914)
Magic Concert (1953)
Magic Cop (1990)
Magic Fire (1955)
The Magic Flute: (1975 & 2006)
Magic Flute Diaries (2008)
Magic Fountain (1963)
The Magic Fountain (1963)
Magic Hour (2011)
The Magic Hour (2008)
The Magic House (1939)
Magic Hunter (1994)
Magic Island (1995)
Magic Kid (1993)
Magic Kid 2 (1994)
Magic Kitchen (2004)
Magic Lamp (2008)
The Magic of Lassie (1978)
Magic Lizard (1985)
Magic Magic (2013)
Magic Magic 3D (2003)
Magic Man (2010)
Magic Matterhorn (1995)
Magic Mike (2012)
Magic Mike XXL (2015)
Magic Mike's Last Dance (2023)
Magic Mirror (2005)
Magic in the Moonlight (2014)
Magic Rock (2001)
The Magic Roundabout (2005)
Magic Silver (2009)
Magic Silver II (2011)
The Magic Sword: (1901, 1950 & 1962)
Magic Temple (1996)
Magic Town (1947)
Magic in Town (1968)
Magic Tree House (2011)
Magic Trick (1953)
Magic Trip (2011)
Magic Village (1955)
Magic Waltz (1918)
Magic in the Water (1995)
Magic to Win (2011)
Magic Wonderland (2014)
Magical Death (1973)
Magical Flowers (1995)
Magical Girl (2014)
The Magical Legend of the Leprechauns (1999) (TV)
Magical Maestro (1952)
Magical Mystery Tour (1967 TV)
Magical Nights (2018)
Magical Universe (2013)
Magician (1967)
Magician: The Astonishing Life and Work of Orson Welles (2014)
The Magician: (1898, 1926, 1958 & 2005)
Magician Mickey (1937)
Magicians (2007)
Magika (2010)
Magikland (2020)
Maging Sino Ka Man (1991)
Magistrarna på sommarlov (1941)
Magiting at Pusakal (1972)
Magizhchi (2010)
Magkakabaung (2014)
Magkano ang Iyong Dangal? (1988)
Magma: Volcanic Disaster (2006)
Magnat (1987)
Magnet of Doom (1963)
Magnetic (2015)
Magnetické vlny léčí (1965)
Magnificat (1993)
The Magnificent Ambersons (1942)
Magnificent Bodyguards (1978)
Magnificent Brute (1936)
Magnificent Desolation: Walking on the Moon 3D (2005)
Magnificent Doll (1946)
The Magnificent Flirt (1928)
Magnificent Obsession: (1935 & 1954)
Magnificent Presence (2012)
Magnificent Roughnecks (1956)
Magnificent Ruffians (1979)
The Magnificent Seven (1960 & 2016)
The Magnificent Seven Deadly Sins (1971)
Magnificent Sinner (1959)
Magnificent Team (1998)
Magnificent Warriors (1987)
Magnifico (2003)
Magnolia (1999)
Magnum Force (1973)
Magnus (2016)
Magnús (1989)
Mago Digo Dai (2010)
Magoo's Puddle Jumper (1956)
Magos y Gigantes (2003)
Magrib (1993)
Magroor: (1950 & 1979)
Magudam (1992)
Magudikkaran (1994)
Magunira Shagada (2002)

Mah

Mah e Mir (2016)
Mah Nakorn (2004)
Maha (TBD)
Maha Badmaash (1977)
Maha Maha (2015)
Maha Manishi (1985)
Maha Nadigan (2004)
Maha Prachandaru (1981)
Maha Purusha (1985)
Maha Purushudu (1981)
Maha Samudram (2021)
Maha-Sangram (1990)
Maha Sati Savitri (1973)
Maha Shaktimaan (1985)
Maha Shaktishaali (1994)
Mahaadev (1989)
Mahaan (1983)
Mahaan Hutatma (2018)
Mahaan Kanakku (2011)
Mahaanta (1997)
Mahanagar (1963)
Mahaashilpi (1966)
Mahabali (1983)
Mahabalipuram (2015)
Mahabharat: (1965 & 2013)
Mahabharat Aur Barbareek (2013)
Mahadeshwara Pooja Phala (1975)
Mahadevi (1957)
Mahadiga (2004)
Mahaguru: (1985 & 2007)
Mahajananiki Maradalu Pilla (1990)
Mahakaal: (1994 & 2008)
Mahakavi Kalidas: (1942 & 1966)
Mahakavi Kalidasa (1955)
Mahakavi Kalidasu (1960)
Mahakavi Kshetrayya (1976)
Mahakshathriya (1994)
Mahal: (1949 & 1969)
Mahalaya (2019)
Mahalia Melts in the Rain (2018)
Mahamantri Timmarusu (1962)
Mahamaya (1944)
Mahana (2016)
Mahanadhi (1994)
Mahanagar (1963)
Mahanagaram (1992)
Mahanagaramlo Mayagadu (1984)
Mahanandi (2005)
Mahanati (2018)
Mahanayak Vasant Tu (2015)
Mahanayika (2016)
Mahanubhavaru (2017)
Mahanubhavudu (2017)
Mahaprabhu (1996)
Mahaprithibi (1991)
Mahapurush (1965)
Mahapurush O Kapurush (2013)
Maharaja: (1998, 2005 & 2011)
Maharaja Ajasath (2015)
Maharaja Gemunu (2015)
Maharaja Talkies (2011)
Maharajavu (1989)
Maharana Pratap: The First Freedom Fighter (2012)
Maharani Minaldevi (1946)
Maharasan (1993)
Maharathi: (2007 & 2008)
Maharathi Karna (1944)
Maharlika (1987)
Maharshi: (1987 & 2019)
Mahasadhvi Mallamma (2005)
Mahasamar (2013)
Mahasamudram (2006)
Mahasathi Anasuya (1965)
Mahasathi Arundathi (1968)
Mahasati Ansuya (1943)
Mahathma Kabir (1962)
Mahatma (2009)
Mahatma Kabir (1947)
Mahatma: Life of Gandhi, 1869–1948 (1968)
Mahatma Phule (1954)
Mahatma Vidur (1943)
Mahatmudu (1976)
Mahaul Theek Hai (1999)
Mahaveera (1988)
Mahaveera Bheeman (1962)
Mahayanam (1989)
Mahazar (1991)
Mahek (2007)
Maheman (1942)
Maherchi Sadi (1991)
Maheshinte Prathikaaram (2016)
Maheswari (1955)
Mahira (2019)
Mahirap Maging Pogi (1992)
Mahiravana (1940)
Mahiru no ankoku (1956)
Mahishasura Mardini (1959)
Mahjong (1996)
Mahjong hōrōki (1984)
Mahler (1974)
Mahler on the Couch (2010)
Mahlia the Mestiza (1943)
Mahogany (1975)
Mahuaa (2018)
Mahulbanir Sereng (2004)

Mai

Mai: (1989 & 2013)
Mai Baap (1959)
Mai Mai Miracle (2009)
Mai Ratima (2012)
Mai Sehra Bandh Ke Aaunga (2017)
The Maid (1991, 2005 & 2009)
Maid for Each Other (1992)
Maid Happy (1933)
Maid in Manhattan (2002)
Maid of the Mist (1915)
Maid to Order (1987)
Maid in Paris (1956)
Maid of Salem (1937) 
Maid o' the Storm (1918)
Maid in Sweden (1971)
Maid, Thief and Guard (1958)
Maid's Night Out (1938)
Maidaan (2021)
Maidan: (1982 & 2014)
Maiden Vows (2010)
Maiden's Cheek (1959)
Maiden's Rock (1922)
Maids (2001)
The Maids (1975)
Maids and Muslin (1920)
Maidstone (1970)
Maigret: (1988 TV & 2022)
Maigret a Pigalle (1966)
Maigret et l'affaire Saint-Fiacre (1959)
Maigret Sets a Trap (1958)
Maigret voit rouge (1963)
Maiko Haaaan!!! (2007)
Maikol Yordan de Viaje Perdido (2014)
Mail (2021)
Mail and Female (1937)
Mail Order Bride: (1964, 1984 & 2008)
Mailman Mueller (1953)
Main Aisa Hi Hoon (2005)
Main Aur Charles (2015)
Main Aur Mera Haathi (1981)
Main Aur Mr. Riight (2014)
Main Aurr Mrs Khanna (2009)
Main Awara Hoon (1983)
Main Azaad Hoon (1989)
Main Balwaan (1986)
Main Bhi Ladki Hoon (1964)
Main Chup Rahungi (1962)
The Main Event (1979)
Main Hari (1940)
Main Hoon Na (2004)
Main Hoon Part-Time Killer (2015)
Main Hoon Shahid Afridi (2013)
Main Intequam Loonga (1982)
Main Jatti Punjab Di (1964)
Main Khiladi Tu Anari (1994)
Main Krishna Hoon (2013)
Main Khudiram Bose Hun (2017)
Main Prem Ki Diwani Hoon (2003)
Main Tulsi Tere Aangan Ki (1978)
Maine Pyar Kiya (1989)
Mainstream (2020)
Maîtresse (1973)

Maj

Majaa (2005)
Majaal (1987)
Majajan (2006)
Majaz: Ae Gham-e-Dil Kya Karun (2017)
Majboor: (1964, 1974 & 1989)
Majestic (2002)
The Majestic (2001)
Majhli Didi (1967)
Majnu: (1987 & 2016)
Majocco Shimai no Yoyo to Nene (2013)
Major (2022)
The Major (2013)
Major Barbara (1941)
Major Chandrakanth: (1966 & 1993)
Major Dundee (1965)
Major Grom (2017)
Major Grom: Plague Doctor (2021)
Major League series:
Major League (1989)
Major League II (1994)
Major League: Back to the Minors (1998)
The Major and the Minor (1942)
Major Payne (1995)
Major Saab (1998)
Major Wilson's Last Stand (1899)
Majority (2010)
Majstori, majstori (1980)
Majuba: Heuwel van Duiwe (1968)
Majubooru Loabi (2000)
Majunu (2001)

Mak

Makala (2017)
Makalkku (2005)
Makam Piranna Manka (1977)
Makan Ente Makan (1985)
Makan esmoh alwatan (2006)
Makane Ninakku Vendi (1971)
Makara Vilakku (1980)
Makarov (1993)
Makdee (2002)
Make Believe Ballroom (1949)
Make Believe Revue (1935)
Make a Fake (2011)
Make Haste to Live (1954)
Make It Big (2002)
Make It Big Big (2019)
Make It Funky! (2005)
Make It Happen (2008)
Make Like a Thief (1964)
Make Me Famous (2020)
Make Me Happy (1935)
Make Me an Offer (1954)
Make Me a Star (1932)
Make a Million (1935)
Make Mine Freedom (1948)
Make Mine Laughs (1949)
Make Mine Mink (1960)
Make Mine Music (1946)
Make a Move (2014)
Make Up (1927)
Make Way for Tomorrow (1937)
Make a Wish: (1937, 2006 & 2011)
Make Your Move (2013)
Make Your Own Bed (1944)
Make the Yuletide Gay (2009)
Make-out with Violence (2008)
Make-Up (1937)
Maker of Men (1931)
Maker of Monsters: The Extraordinary Life of Beau Dick (2017)
Makeroom (2018)
Makers: Women Who Make America (2013)
Makers of Melody (1929)
Makeup Man (2011)
Making an American Citizen (1912)
Making Auntie Welcome (1914)
Making Babies (2001)
The Making of Fanny and Alexander (1984)
Making Friends (1936)
Making Good (1932)
Making the Grade: (1929 & 1984)
Making the Headlines (1938)
Making It (1971)
Making It Pleasant for Him (1909)
Making a Killing (2018)
The Making of a Legend: Gone with the Wind (1988)
Making a Living (1914)
Making Love (1982)
Making of a Male Model (1983 TV)
Making a Man (1922)
The Making of a Man (1911)
Making Montgomery Clift (2018)
Making Mr. Right (1987)
Making Of (2006)
Making Overtures: The Story of a Community Orchestra (1985)
Making Plans for Lena (2009)
Making Sandwiches (1998)
Making Stars (1935)
Making Up! (1993)
Making the Varsity (1928)
Making Waves: The Art of Cinematic Sound (2019)
The Makioka Sisters (1983)
Makiusap Ka sa Diyos (1991)
Makkal (1975)
Makkal Aatchi (1995)
Maku ga Agaru (2015)

Mal

Mal-Mo-E: The Secret Mission (2019)
Mala: (1941 & 2013)
Mala Aai Vhhaychy! (2011)
Mala Época (1998)
Mala gente (1952)
Mala hembra (1950)
Mala leche (2004)
Mala Mala (2014)
Mala Noche (1985)
Mala Oru Mangala Vilakku (1959)
Malaal (2019)
Malaga (1954)
Malai Malai (2009)
Malaikat Tanpa Sayap (2012)
Malaikkallan (1954)
Malaikottai (2007)
Malaiyoor Mambattiyan (1983)
Malajahna (1965)
Malamaal Weekly (2006)
Malambo: (1942 & 1984)
Malambo, the Good Man (2018)
Malamor (2003)
Malamore (1982)
Malamukalile Daivam (1983)
Malan (1942)
Malang (2020)
Malanga (1986)
Malankattu (1980)
Malapata (2017)
Malappuram Haji Mahanaya Joji (1994)
Malaria: (1919, 1943 & 2016)
Malarinum Melliya (2008)
Malarum Kiliyum (1986)
Malarvaadi Arts Club (2010)
Malaspina (1947)
Malaya (1949)
Malcolm (1986)
Malcolm & Marie (2021)
Malcolm X: (1972 & 1992)
La Maldicion de la Bestia (1975)
Male and Female (1919)
Malèna (2000)
Maleficent (2014)
Maleficent: Mistress of Evil (2019)
Malevil (1972)
Malevolence (2004)
Malibu High (1979)
Malibu's Most Wanted (2003)
Malice: (1926 & 1993)
Malice in Wonderland: (1985 TV & 2009)
Malicious: (1973, 1995 & 2018)
Malignant: (2013 & 2021)
Mallboy (2001)
Malli (1998)
Mallrats (1995)
Malta Story (1953)
The Maltese Falcon: (1931 & 1941)

Mam

Mam (2010)
Mama: (1990 & 2013)
Mama Alludu (1990)
Mama Bagunnava (1997)
Mama Bhanja (1977)
Mama Colonel (2017)
Mama Don't Cry (1998)
Mama Dracula (1980)
Mama Flora's Family (1998) (TV)
Mama, I Want to Sing! (2012)
Mama, I'm Alive (1977)
Mamá Inés (1945)
Mama Jack (2005)
Mama Ji (1964)
Mama Loves Papa: (1933 & 1945)
Mama Manchu Alludu Kanchu (2015)
Mama Married (1969)
Mama Runs Wild (1937)
Mama Steps Out (1937)
Mama, There's A Man in Your Bed (1989)
Mama Turns 100 (1979)
Mama's Affair (1921)
Mama's Boy (2007)
Mama's Dirty Girls (1974)
Mama's Girl (2018)
Mama's Gone A-Hunting (1977)
Mama's Little Pirate (1934)
Mamba (1930)
Mambo Italiano (2003)
Mamaboy (2017)
Mamachya Gavala Jaaoo Yaa (2014)
Mamakiki (2020)
Mamalakalkkappurathu (1988)
Maman (2012)
Maman Last Call (2005)
Mamangam (2019)
Mamarazzi (2010)
Mamaroš (2013)
Mamathe (1968)
Mamatheya Bandhana (1966)
Mamatheya Madilu (1985)
Mamay (2003)
Mamba (1930)
Mambattiyan (2011)
Mambéty for Ever (2008)
Mambo (1954)
Mambo Italiano (2003)
Mambru Went to War (1985)
Mame (1974)
Mameshiba Ichirō 3D (2012)
Mami (1971)
Mamie (2016)
Mamiya kyodai (2006)
Mamiyar (1953)
Mamiyar Mechina Marumagal (1959)
Mamiyarum Oru Veetu Marumagale (1961)
Mamma (1982)
Mamma Ebe (1985)
Mamma Gógó (2010)
Mamma mia, che impressione! (1951)
Mamma Mia (1995)
Mamma Mia! (2008)
Mamma Mia! Here We Go Again (2018)
Mamma Moo and the Crow (2008)
Mamma Roma (1962)
Mamma's Boys (1916)
Mammal (2016)
Mammalian (2010)
Mammame (1986)
Mammoth: (2006 TV & 2009)
Mammuth (2010)
Mammy: (1930 & 1951)
Mampazhakkalam (2004)
Mamsell Nitouche (1932)
Mamta: (1942, 1952 & 1966)

Man

The Man: (1972 & 2005)
A Man About the House (1947)
Man About Town (2006)
A Man for All Seasons: (1966 & 1988)
A Man Apart (2003)
Man of Aran (1934)
A Man on the Beach (1955)
A Man Before His Time (1971)
The Man Behind the Mask (1936)
A Man Betrayed: (1936 & 1941)
Man Bites Dog (1992)
The Man from Blankley's (1930)
A Man from the Boulevard des Capuchines (1987)
A Man Called Gannon (1968)
A Man Called Hero (1999)
A Man Called Horse (1970)
A Man Called Otto (2022)
A Man Called Ove (2015)
A Man Called Sarge (1990)
Man of the Century (1999)
The Man from the Deep River (1972)
The Man from Earth (2007)
The Man from Elysian Fields (2002)
A Man Escaped (1956)
Man Facing Southeast (1987)
Man on Fire: (1987 & 2004)
Man of Flowers (1983)
Man on the Flying Trapeze (1935)
Man of the Frontier (1936)
Man of God: (2021 & 2022)
The Man with the Golden Arm (1955)
The Man with the Golden Gun (1974)
The Man in the Gray Flannel Suit (1956)
The Man in Grey (1943)
The Man from Home: (1914 & 1922)
The Man from Hong Kong (1975)
Man of the House: (1995 & 2005)
Man Hunt: (1941 & 1985)
Man of Iron (1981)
The Man with the Iron Fists (2012)
The Man with the Iron Fists 2 (2015)
The Man in the Iron Mask: (1923, 1939, 1977 TV, 1985 TV & 1998)
The Man from Laramie (1955)
Man on a Ledge (2012)
The Man from London (2007)
The Man with the Magic Box (2017)
Man of La Mancha (1972)
Man of Marble (1977)
Man of the Match (2022)
Man with a Million (1954)
The Man in the Moon (1991)
Man on the Moon (1999)
Man with a Movie Camera (1929)
The Man with Nine Lives (1940)
A Man of No Importance (1994)
The Man Nobody Knew (2011)
The Man from Nowhere: (1937, 1961 & 2010)
The Man from O.R.G.Y. (1970)
The Man with One Red Shoe (1985)
The Man on the Other Side (2019)
The Man from Planet X (1951)
Man Push Cart (2005)
The Man with Rain in His Shoes (1998)
The Man on the Roof (1976)
Man with the Screaming Brain (2005)
The Man in Search of His Murderer (1931)
The Man in the Sky (1957)
The Man from Snowy River: (1920 & 1982)
The Man from Snowy River II (1988)
Man of Steel (2013)
Man on a Swing (1974)
Man of a Thousand Faces (1957)
Man on a Tightrope (1953)
The Man from Toronto: (1933 & 2022)
The Man with the Twisted Lip (1921)
The Man with Two Brains (1983)
The Man from U.N.C.L.E. (2015)
A Man Vanishes (1967)
Man Walking Around a Corner (1887)
Man Wanted: (1932 & 1995)
Man Wants to Live (1961)
Man of the West (1958)
The Man in the White Suit (1951)
The Man Who Bought London (1916)
The Man Who Came to Dinner: (1942 & 1972 TV)
The Man Who Captured Eichmann (1996)
The Man Who Cheated Himself (1950)
The Man Who Could Not Laugh (1968)
The Man Who Could Work Miracles (1936)
The Man Who Cried (2000)
The Man Who Defended Gavrilo Princip (2014)
The Man Who Drew God (TBD)
The Man Who Fell to Earth (1976)
The Man Who Invented Christmas (2017)
The Man Who Killed Don Quixote (2018)
The Man Who Killed Hitler and Then the Bigfoot (2018)
The Man Who Knew Infinity (2015)
The Man Who Knew Too Little (1997)
The Man Who Knew Too Much: (1934 & 1956)
The Man Who Laughs: (1928, 1966 & 2012)
The Man Who Lies (1968)
The Man Who Liked Funerals (1959)
The Man Who Loved Cat Dancing (1973)
The Man Who Loved Women: (1977 & 1983)
The Man Who Never Was (1956)
The Man Who Shot Liberty Valance (1962)
The Man Who Sleeps (1974)
The Man Who Sued God (2001)
The Man Who Turned to Stone (1957)
The Man Who Was Sherlock Holmes (1937)
A Man Who Was Superman (2008)
The Man Who Wasn't There: (1983, 1987 & 2001)
The Man Who Would Be King (1975)
Man in the Wilderness (1971)
Man on Wire (2008)
The Man Without a Face (1993)
The Man Without Gravity (2019)
The Man Without a Past (2002)
Man Without a Star (1955)
A Man and a Woman (1966)
A Man and a Woman: 20 Years Later (1986)
Man of the Year (2006)
Man's Best Friend (1993)
Man's Favorite Sport? (1964)
A Man, a Real One (2003)
Man-Thing (2005) (TV)
Management (2009)
Manatsu no Chikyū (1991)
Manchester by the Sea (2016)
The Manchurian Candidate: (1962 & 2004)
Mandabi (1968)
Mandala (1981)
Mandela: Long Walk to Freedom (2013)
Manderlay (2005)
Mandibles (2020)
Mandingo (1975)
Mandragora (1997)
Mandy (2018)
Mangal Pandey (2005)
Mangetsu no Kuchizuke (1989)
Manglehorn (2014)
The Mangler (1995)
The Mangler Reborn (2005)
Manhandled (1924 & 1949)
Manhatta (1922)
Manhattan: (1924 & 1979)
Manhattan Baby (1982)
Manhattan Melodrama (1934)
Manhattan Murder Mystery (1993)
The Manhattan Project (1986)
Manhood (2003)
Manhunter (1986)
Maniac: (1934, 1963, 1980 & 2012)
Maniac Cop (1988)
Maniac Cop 2 (1990)
Manic (2003)
Manila in the Claws of Light (1975)
The Manitou (1979)
Mank (2020)
Manly Times (1977)
Mann (1999)
Mannequin: (1937 & 1987)
Manolete (2006)
Manon des Sources (1986)
The Manor (2021)
Manos: The Hands of Fate (1966)
Le Mans (1971)
Mansfield Park: (1999 & 2007 TV)
The Mansion (2017)
Mansion of the Living Dead (1982)
Manson (1973)
The Manson Family (2004)
Manson Family Vacation (2015)
Manson’s Night of Horror: The Day We Murdered Sharon Tate (2021)
Manufactured Landscapes (2006)
Manufacturing Consent: Noam Chomsky and the Media (1992)
The Manxman (1929)
The Many Adventures of Winnie the Pooh (1977)
Many Rivers to Cross (1955)
The Many Saints of Newark (2021)

Mao–Maq

Mao Tse Tung (2007)
Mao Zedong 1949 (2019)
Mao's Last Dancer (2009)
A Maori Maid's Love (1916)
The Maori Merchant of Venice (2002)
Map of the Human Heart (1993)
The Map Reader (2008)
Map of Salvation (2015)
Map of the Sounds of Tokyo (2009)
The Map of Tiny Perfect Things (2021)
A Map of the World (1999)
Mapado (2005)
Mapado 2: Back to the Island (2007)
Mapla Singam (2016)
Maple Palm (2006)
The Mapmaker (2012)
Mappillai: (1989 & 2011)
Mappillai Gounder (1997)
Mappillai Manasu Poopola (1996)
Mappillai Sir (1988)
Mapplethorpe (2018)
Mapplethorpe: Look at the Pictures (2016)
Maps to the Stars (2014)
Mapule's Choice (2008)
Maquia: When the Promised Flower Blooms (2018)
Maquilapolis (2006)

Mar

Mar adentro (2004)
Mar Chokka (2017)
Mar Jawan Gur Khake (2010)
El Mar La Mar (2017)
Mar Yar Project (2014)
Mara (2018)
Mara Maru (1952)
Mara Pappa Superhero (2021)
Mara of the Wilderness (1965)
Maracaibo (1958)
Maradona (2018)
Maradona, the Hand of God (2007)
Maradona by Kusturica (2008)
Maragatha Veenai (1986)
Maragatham (1959)
Marat/Sade (1967)
The Marathon Family (1982)
Marathon Man (1976)
Marauders: (1986 & 2016)
Marcel the Shell with Shoes On: (2010 & 2021)
March Comes in like a Lion (2017)
The March of Fools (1975)
March of the Penguins (2005)
March of Time: Inside Nazi Germany (1938)
Marci X (2003)
Marco Polo: (1962 & 2007 TV)
Mardi Gras: (1943 & 1958)
Mardi Gras Massacre (1978)
Mardi Gras: Spring Break (2011)
Il Mare (2000)
Mare Nostrum: (1926 & 1948)
Marebito (2005)
Margaret: (2009 TV & 2011)
Margaret's Museum (1995)
Margarita with a Straw (2014)
Margin Call (2011)
Margot at the Wedding (2008)
Marguerite: (2015 & 2017)
Maria Full of Grace (2004)
María Candelaria (1944)
El Mariachi (1992)
Marian Anderson: the Lincoln Memorial Concert (1939)
Marie Antoinette: (1938 & 2006)
Marie-Chantal contre le docteur Kha (1965)
Marihuana (1936)
Marihuana (El monstruo verde) (1936)
The Marihuana Story (1950)
Marilyn Hotchkiss' Ballroom Dancing and Charm School (2005)
The Marine series:
The Marine (2006)
The Marine 2 (2009)
The Marine 3: Homefront (2013)
The Marine 4: Moving Target (2015)
The Marine 5: Battleground (2017)
The Marine 6: Close Quarters (2018)
Marine Boy (2009)
The Marines Are Coming (1936)
Mario: (1984 & 2018)
Mario, Maria and Mario (1993)
Marion Bridge (2002)
Marius: (1931 & 2013)
Marjoe (1972)
Marjorie Morningstar (1958)
Marjorie Prime (2017)
The Mark: (1961 & 2012)
Mark of the Devil: (1970 & 2020)
Mark of the Vampire (1935)
The Mark of Zorro: (1920, 1940 & 1974 TV)
Marked for Death (1990)
Marked Woman (1937)
Marketa Lazarová (1967)
The Marksman: (1953, 2005 & 2021)
Marley (2012)
Marley & Me (2008)
Marley & Me: The Puppy Years (2011)
Marlina the Murderer in Four Acts (2017)
Marlowe: (1969 & 2022)
Marmaduke (2010)
Marmoulak (2004)
Marnie (1964)
Maroko (1990)
Marooned: (1933, 1969 & 2004)
Marooned Awakening (2022)
The Marquise of O (1976)
The Marriage Circle (1924)
The Marriage of Figaro: (1920, 1949 & 1960 TV)
Marriage Italian Style (1964)
The Marriage of Maria Braun (1979)
Marriage Story: (1992 & 2019)
The Married Couple of the Year Two (1971)
Married Life: (1921 & 2007)
Married to the Mob (1988)
Marrowbone (2017)
Marry Me: (1925, 1932 & 2022)
Marry Me! (1949)
Mars: (1930, 1968 & 2004)
Mars Attacks! (1996)
Mars Needs Moms (2011)
Mars Needs Women (1967) (TV)
Mars: Tada, Kimi wo Aishiteru (2016)
La Marseillaise (1938)
Martha Marcy May Marlene (2011)
Martha, Inc.: The Story of Martha Stewart (2003)
Martha, Meet Frank, Daniel and Laurence (1998)
Martial Club (1981)
The Martian (2015)
Martian Child (2007)
Martian Through Georgia (1962)
Martians Go Home (1990)
Martin: (1978 & 1981)
Martin Lawrence Live: Runteldat (2002)
Marty (1955)
Martyrs: (2008 & 2015)
Martín Fierro (1968)
The Marvels (2023)
Marvin's Room (1996)
Marwencol (2010)
Mary: (1931, 2005) & Mary
Mary from Beijing (1992)
Mary Magdalene (2018)
Mary and Max (2009)
Mary Poppins (1964)
Mary Poppins Returns (2018)
Mary Queen of Scots: (2013 & 2018)
Mary, Queen of Scots (1971)
Mary, Queen of Tots (1925)
Mary Reilly (1996)
Mary of Scotland (1936)
Mary Shelley (2017)
Mary Shelley's Frankenstein (1994)
Mary Stevens, M.D. (1933)
Mary and the Witch's Flower (2017)
Maryam: (1953, 2002 & 2021)

Mas

Mas alla de los Gritos (1999)
Masani (2013)
Maschenka (1987)
Maschera nera (1952)
Maschiaccio (1917)
Maschio latino cercasi (1977)
Mascots: (1929 & 2016)
Mascotte (1920)
Masculin Féminin (1966)
M*A*S*H (1970)
Masha (2004)
Mashaal (1984)
Mashenka (1942)
Mashooq (1992)
Masikip sa Dibdib (2004)
Mask: (1938, 1985 & 2019)
The Mask: (1961 & 1994)
Mask-A-Raid (1931)
Mask of the Avenger (1951)
Mask in Blue: (1943 & 1953)
Mask of Desire (2000)
The Mask of Diijon (1946)
The Mask of Dimitrios (1944)
Mask of the Dragon (1951)
Mask of Dust (1954)
The Mask of Fu Manchu (1932)
Mask of Murder (1985)
Mask of the Red Death (1969)
The Mask of Zorro (1998)
Maska: (2009 & 2020)
Masked (1920)
Masked and Anonymous (2003)
Masked Avengers (1981)
Masked Ball (1918)
The Masked Man Against the Pirates (1964)
The Masked Saint (2015)
Masks: (1929 & 1987)
The Masque of the Red Death: (1964 & 1989)
Masquerade: (1929, 1941, 1965, 1988 & 2012)
The Masquerader: (1914, 1922 & 1933)
Mass: (2004 & 2021)
Mass Appeal (1984)
The Mass Is Ended (1985)
The Massacre (1912)
Massacre at Central High (1976)
Massacre in Dinosaur Valley (1985)
The Master: (1980, 1992, 2005, 2009, 2012 & 2015)
A Master Builder (2013)
Master and Commander: The Far Side of the World (2003)
The Master of Disguise (2002)
Master of the Flying Guillotine (1976)
The Master Gunfighter (1975)
Master Hands (1936)
Master of the House (1925)
The Master Mind (1914)
Master of the World (1961)
Mastermind (1976)
Masterminds: (1997, 2013, & 2016)
Masters of the Universe (1987)
Masti (2004)

Mat

Mata: (1942 & 2006)
Mata Hari: (1927, 1931 & 1985)
Mata Hari, Agent H21 (1964)
Mata Hari's Daughter (1954)
Matador (1986)
The Matador (2006)
Matana MiShamayim (2003)
Matango (1963)
Matariki (2010)
Matataki (2010)
The Match Factory Girl (1990)
Match Point (2005)
Matchbox: (2002 & 2017)
Matching Dreams (1916)
Matching Jack (2010)
Matchless (1967)
The Matchmaker: (1958, 1997 & 2018)
Matchstick Men (2003)
Mate (2019)
Mate Bohu Kari Nei Jaa (2011)
Mate Ta Love Helare (2008)
Mated in the Wilds (1921)
Mateo: (1937 & 2014)
Mater dei (1950)
Mater and the Ghostlight (2006)
Material (2012)
Material Girls (2006)
Maternal Secrets (2018)
Maternity (1917)
Mates (1999)
Mates and Models (1919)
Mates from the Murrumbidgee (1911)
Matewan (1987)
Matha (2012)
Mathadana (2001)
Mathai Kuzhappakkaranalla (2014)
Mathapoo (2013)
Mathar Kula Manikkam (1956)
Matilda: (1978, 1996, 2017 & 2022)
Matinee (1993)
The Mating Habits of the Earthbound Human (1999)
The Matrix series:
The Matrix (1999)
The Matrix Reloaded (2003)
The Matrix Revolutions (2003)
The Matrix Resurrections (2021)
Matru Ki Bijlee Ka Mandola (2013)
The Mattei Affair (1972)
A Matter of Life and Death (1946)
A Matter of Time (1976)
Matthias & Maxime (2019)

Mau-Max

Maud Rockefeller's Bet (1924)
Maudie (2016)
Maudite soit la guerre (1914)
Maujaan Dubai Diyaan (1985)
Mauji Jeevan (1944)
Mauli (2018)
Maundy Thursday (2006)
Maung Doe Cherry Myay (1963)
Maung Mu Paing Shin: (1964 & 2000)
Mauprat (1926)
Maurice (1987)
Maurie (1973)
The Mauritanian (2021)
Mausam: (1975 & 2011)
Mausam Ikrar Ke Do Pal Pyar Ke (2018)
Mausoleum (1983)
Mauvaise Graine (1934)
Maverick (1994)
Mavis! (2016)
Mawali No.1 (2002)
Max: (1994, 2002 & 2015)
 Max, 13 (1999)
Max 2: White House Hero (2017)
Max & Co (2007)
Max Dugan Returns (1983)
Max Embarrassing 2 (2011)
Max Havelaar (1976)
Max Havoc: Curse of the Dragon (2005)
Max Havoc: Ring of Fire (2006)
Max Headroom: 20 Minutes into the Future (1985 TV)
Max and Helen (1990)
Max Hell Frog Warrior (1996)
Max and His Mother-in-Law (1911)
Max et Jérémie (1992)
Max et les ferrailleurs (1971)
Max Keeble's Big Move (2001)
Max Knight: Ultra Spy (2000)
Max, Mon Amour (1986)
Max and Moritz (1956)
Max Payne (2008)
Max the Pickpocket (1962)
Max Rose (2016)
Maxie: (1954 & 1985)
Maxime (1958)
Maxime, McDuff & McDo (2002)
Maximum (2012)
Maximum Conviction (2012)
Maximum Impact (2017)
Maximum Overdrive (1986)
Maximum Ride (2016)
Maximum Risk (1996)
Maximum Shame (2010)
Maxwell (2007)

May-Maz

May (2002)
May 18 (2007)
May Allah Bless France! (2014)
May December (TBD)
May the Devil Take You (2018)
May the Devil Take You Too (2020)
May Fools (1990)
May God Bless America (2006)
May God Forgive Me (1948)
May God Forgive You... But I Won't (1968)
May God Save Us (2016)
May I Borrow Your Girl Tonight? (1978)
May Maadham (1994)
May Minamahal (1993)
May Morning (1970)
May Nights (1952)
May Who? (2015)
Maya: (1961, 1966, 1999, 2001, 2015 Pakistani, 2015 Tamil & 2018)
Maya: The Lost Mother (2019)
Maya 3D (2016)
Maya the Bee (2014)
Maya the Bee: The Honey Games (2018)
Maya Dardel (2017)
Maya Darpan (1972)
Maya Kannadi: (2007 & 2020)
Maya Lin: A Strong Clear Vision (1994)
Maya Manithan (1958)
Maya Maschindra (1975)
Maya Mayavan (1938)
Maya Mayooram (1993)
Maya Memsaab (1993)
Maya Miriga (1984)
Maya Nagari (1944)
Maya of the Seven Veils (1951)
Mayabazar: (1936, 1957, 1995 & 2006)
Mayabazar 2016 (2020)
Mayabini (1992)
Mayak (2006)
Mayakkam Enna (2011)
Mayalamari (1951)
Mayalodu (1993)
Mayalokam (1945)
Mayamohini (2012)
Mayan Renaissance (2012)
Mayanadi (2017)
Mayandi Kudumbathar (2009)
Mayanginen Thayanginen (2012)
Mayangukiral Oru Maadhu (1975)
Mayani Mamata (1970)
Mayaponman (1997)
Mayar Badhon (1997)
Mayavathi (1949)
Mayavi: (1965 & 2007)
Maybe Baby (2001)
Maybe I Should Have (2010)
Maybe I'll Come Home in the Spring (1971 TV)
Maybe It's Love: (1930 & 1935)
Maybe a Love Story (2018)
Maybe This Time: (1980 & 2014)
Maybe Tomorrow (2012)
Mayblossom (1917)
Mayday: (2005 & 2021)
Mayday at 40,000 Feet! (1976 TV)
Mayerling: (1936, 1957 TV & 1968)
Mayeya Musuku (1980)
Mayfair (2018)
Mayfly (2008)
Mayhem (2017)
Mayor (2020)
The Mayor: (1997 & 2017)
The Mayor of Casterbridge: (1921 & 2003 TV)
The Mayor of Hell (1933)
The Mayor of Rione Sanità (2019)
Mayrig (1992)
Maytime: (1923, 1926 & 1937)
Maza Pati Karodpati (1988)
Mazaa Mazaa (2005)
Mazaaq (1975)
Mazdoor (1983)
Mazdoor Zindabaad (1976)
Maze: (2000 & 2017)
The Maze: (1953 & 2010)
Maze Runner series:
The Maze Runner (2014)
Maze Runner: The Scorch Trials (2015)
Maze Runner: The Death Cure (2018)
Maze: Secret Love (2015)
Mazeppa: (1909 & 1993)
Mazes and Monsters (1982 TV)
Mazha (2000)
Mazha Nilaavu (1983)
Mazha Peyyunnu Maddalam Kottunnu (1986)
Mazhai (2005)
Mazhakaaru (1973)
Mazhanool Kanav (2003)
Mazhathullikkilukkam (2002)
Mazhavilkavadi (1989)
Mazhavilkoodaram (1995)
Mazhavillinattam Vare (2012)
Mazhavillu (1999)
Mazhayathu (2018)
Mazhayethum Munpe (1995)
Mazhu (1982)
Mazloom (1986)
Mazurka (1935)

Mb–Mc

MBA Partners (2016)
McBain (1991)
McCabe & Mrs. Miller (1971)
McDull, The Alumni (2006)
McDull: Me & My Mum (2014)
McDull: Rise of the Rice Cooker (2016)
McFarland, USA (2015)
McHale's Navy: (1964 & 1997)
McHale's Navy Joins the Air Force (1965)
The McKenzie Break (1970)
McLintock! (1963)
The McPherson Tape (1989)
McQ (1974)
McVicar (1980)

Me

Me... Myself (2007)
Me Before You (2016)
Me and the Big Guy (1999)
Me and Bobby Fischer (2009)
Me and Her (2006)
Me and Marlborough (1935)
Me Myself I (2000)
Me and Orson Welles (2009)
Me Time (2022)
Me Without You (2001)
Me and You (2012)
Me and You and Everyone We Know (2005)
Me You Them (2000)
Me, Myself & Irene (2000)

Mea-Med

Mea Culpa (2014)
Meadowland (2015)
Meadowoods (2010)
Mean Creek (2004)
Mean Dog Blues (1978)
Mean Dreams (2016)
Mean Frank and Crazy Tony (1973)
Mean Girls (2004)
Mean Girls 2 (2011 TV)
Mean Guns (1997)
Mean Johnny Barrows (1976)
Mean Machine (2001)
Mean People Suck (2001)
The Mean Season (1985)
Mean Streets (1973)
Mean Tricks (1992)
Meant to Beh (2017)
Meantime (1983)
Meanwhile: (1998 & 2011)
Measure of a Man (2018)
Measure for Measure (1943)
Measuring the World (2012)
Meat Grinder (2009)
Meat Loaf: In Search of Paradise (2007)
Meat Love (1989)
Meat Market (2000)
Meat Market 2 (2001)
Meat Weed Madness (2006)
Meatballs series:
Meatballs (1979)
Meatballs 2 (1984)
Meatballs III: Summer Job (1986)
Meatballs 4 (1992)
Meatless Flyday (1944)
Meatless Tuesday (1943)
The Mechanic series:
The Mechanic: (1972 & 2011)
Mechanic: Resurrection (2016)
Mechanic Alludu (1993)
Mechanical Suite (2001)
Mechanics of the Brain (1926)
Med dej i mina armar (1940)
Med glorian på sned (1957)
Med kærlig hilsen (1971)
Med Maud over Polhavet (1926)
Meda Meeda Abbayi (2017)
Meda or the Not So Bright Side of Things (2017)
Medal for the General (1944)
Medal of Honor (2009)
The Medallion (2003)
The Meddler (2015)
Meddling Women (1924)
Medea: (1959, 1969, 1988, 2017 & 2021)
Medea Miracle (2007)
Medeni mjesec (1983)
Medha Sharma (1940)
Medicine Man (1992)
Medicine for Melancholy (2008)
Medieval (2022)
Medio millón por una mujer (1940)
The Medium: (1921, 1951, 1992 & 2021)
Medium Cool (1969)
Mediterraneo (1991)
Medulla Oblongata (2014)
Medusa (1973)
Medusa Challenger (1977)
The Medusa Touch (1978)
Medusa: Dare to Be Truthful (1991)

Mee-Mem

Mee Aayana Jagratha (1998)
Mee Loaybakee (2017)
Mee Pok Man (1995)
Mee Raqsam (2020)
Mee Sindhutai Sapkal (2010)
Mee-Shee: The Water Giant (2005)
Meek's Cutoff (2011)
Meeku Maathrame Cheptha (2019)
Meeku Meere Maaku Meme (2016)
Meel Patthar (2020)
Meelo Evaru Koteeswardu (2016)
Meen Kuzhambum Mann Paanaiyum (2016)
Meena (2014)
Meenakshi Kalyanam (1998)
Meenakshi Thiruvilayadal (1989)
Meenamasathile Sooryan (1986)
Meenathil Thalikettu (1998)
Meenava Nanban (1977)
Meenaxi: A Tale of Three Cities (2004)
Meenda Sorgam (1960)
Meendum Kokila (1981)
Meendum Oru Kaathal Kathai (1985)
Meendum Oru Kadhal Kadhai (2016)
Meet the Applegates (1990)
Meet Bill (2007)
Meet the Browns (2008)
Meet Dave (2008)
Meet the Deedles (1998)
Meet the Feebles (1989)
Meet the Fockers (2005)
Meet the Hollowheads (1989)
Meet the Missus: (1937 & 1940)
Meet Joe Black (1998)
Meet John Doe (1941)
Meet Me in St. Louis (1944)
Meet Miss Anxiety (2014)
Meet the Parents (2000)
Meet the Robinsons (2007)
Meet the Spartans (2008)
The Meg (2018)
Meg 2: The Trench (2023)
Meg the Lady (1916)
Mega Mendoeng (1942)
Mega Piranha (2010)
Mega Python vs. Gatoroid (2011)
Mega Shark series:
Mega Shark Versus Giant Octopus (2009)
Mega Shark Versus Crocosaurus (2010)
Mega Shark Versus Mecha Shark (2014)
Mega Shark Versus Kolossus (2015)
Mega Snake (2007)
Megachurch Murder (2015 TV)
Megaforce (1982)
Megam Karuththirukku (1987)
Megamind (2010)
Megan: (2018 & 2023)
Megan Is Missing (2011)
Megane (2007)
Megh Roddur (2013)
Megh o Roudra (1969)
Meghe Dhaka Tara (1960)
Megiddo: The Omega Code 2 (2001)
Mehed ei nuta (1968)
Mehndi (1998)
Mekhong Full Moon Party (2002)
Melancholia: (2008 & 2011)
Melinda and Melinda (2004)
Mélo (1986)
Melody: (1953, 1971 & 2014)
Melody Lane: (1929 & 1941)
Melody and Moonlight (1940)
Melody Ranch (1940)
Melody and Romance (1937)
Melody Time (1948)
Melvin and Howard (1980)
The Member of the Wedding (1952)
Meme (2018)
Memento (2000)
Memento Mori (1999)
Memoirs of a Geisha (2005)
Memoirs of an Invisible Man (1992)
Mémorable (2019)
Memoria: (2015 & 2021)
Memories: (1995, 2013 & 2014)
Memories of Matsuko (2006)
Memories of Murder (1990) (TV)
Memories of Murder (2003)
Memories of a River (1990)
Memories of Underdevelopment (1968)
Memory: (2006, 2008 & 2022)
Memory House (2020)
The Memory of Justice (1976)
The Memory of a Killer (2005)
Memory Lane: (1926 & 2012)
Memory: The Origins of Alien (2019)
Memphis Belle (1990)
The Memphis Belle: A Story of a Flying Fortress (1944)
Memron (2004)

Men-Mey

Men: (1918, 1924, 1997 & 2022)
The Men: (1950 & 1971)
Men Against the Sky (1940)
Men Behind the Sun (1987)
Men in Black series:
Men in Black (1997)
Men in Black II (2002)
Men in Black 3 (2012)
Men in Black: International (2019)
Men Boxing (1891)
Men with Brooms (2002)
Men & Chicken (2015)
Men of Honor (2000)
Men Must Fight (1933)
Men of the Sky: (1931 & 1942)
Men O' War (1929)
The Men Who Stare at Goats (2009)
The Men Who Tread on the Tiger's Tail (1952)
Men and Women: (1964 & 1999)
Men at Work: (1990 & 2006)
Menace II Society (1993)
Menace from Outer Space (1956)
Ménage (1986)
Menashe (2017)
The Menu: (2016 & 2022)
Mephisto: (1931 & 1981)
The Mephisto Waltz (1971)
La Mer (1895)
Mera Naam Joker (1970)
The Mercenary (1968)
Mercenary for Justice (2006)
The Merchant of Four Seasons (1971)
The Merchant of Venice: (1914, 1916, 1923, 1953, 1961, 1969 & 2004)
Merci pour le Chocolat (2000)
Mercury Man (2006)
Mercury Rising (1998)
Mercy (2014 film) (2019)
The Mercy of the Jungle (2018)
Merlin: (1998 & 2018)
Merlin's Shop of Mystical Wonders (1996)
The Mermaid: (1910, 1965 & 2016)
Mermaid: (1996, 2000 & 2007)
Mermaid Legend (1984)
Mermaids: (1990 & 2003 TV)
Mermaids: The Body Found (2012)
Mermaid's Scar (1993) (OVA)
Merrily We Live (1938)
Merrily We Roll Along (TBD)
Merry Andrew (1958)
Merry Christmas: (2000 & 2001)
Merry Christmas, Drake & Josh (2008)
Merry Christmas, Mr. Lawrence (1983)
The Merry Frolics of Satan (1906)
The Merry Gentleman (2009)
The Merry Widow: (1918, 1925, 1934, 1952 & 1961)
The Merry Wives (1938)
The Merry Wives of Tyrol (1964)
The Merry Wives of Vienna (1931)
The Merry Wives of Windsor: (1910, 1918, 1950 & 1965) 
Merry-Go-Round: (1923, 1956, 1981, 2010 & 2017)
Mesa of Lost Women (1953)
Meshes of the Afternoon (1943)
Mesmer (1994)
Mesrine: (1984 & 2008)
The Message: (1976 & 2009)
Message in a Bottle (1999)
Message from the King (2016)
A Message to Garcia (1936)
Messalina: (1924, 1951 & 1960)
Messalina vs. the Son of Hercules (1964)
The Messenger: (1918, 1937, 2008, 2009, 2015 British & 2015 Canadian)
The Messenger: The Story of Joan of Arc (1999)
The Messengers (2007)
Messengers 2: The Scarecrow (2009)
The Messiah: (1975 & 2007)
Messiah of Evil (1973)
Metal: A Headbanger's Journey (2005)
Metallic Blues (2004)
Metallica: Some Kind of Monster (2003)
Metallica Through the Never (2013)
Metalstorm: The Destruction of Jared-Syn (1983)
Meteor (1979)
The Meteor Man (1993)
The Method (2005)
Metro: (1997, 2013 & 2016)
The Metro (2011)
Metro Manila (2013)
Metroland (1997)
Metronome (2002)
Metropolis: (1927 & 2001)
Metropolitan: (1935 & 1990)
Metrosexual (2006)
Mexicali Shmoes (1959)
The Mexican (2001)
Mexican Bus Ride (1952)
The Meyerowitz Stories (2017)

Mi

Mia-Mid

Mia and the Migoo (2008)
Mia moglie torna a scuola (1981)
Mia moglie è una strega (1980)
Mia nonna poliziotto (1958)
Mia and the White Lion (2018)
Miami: (1924 & 2017)
Miami Beach (2016)
Miami Blues (1990)
Miami Connection (1988)
Miami Exposé (1956)
Miami Rhapsody (1995)
The Miami Story (1954)
Miami Supercops (1985)
Miami Vice (2006)
Miarka: (1920 & 1937)
Mice Follies (1960)
Mice and Men (1916)
Michael: (1924, 1996, 2011 Austrian & 2011 Indian)
Michael the Brave (1971)
Michael Clayton (2007)
Michael Collins (1996)
Michael Jackson's This Is It (2009)
Michael Jordan: An American Hero (1999 TV)
Michael Jordan to the Max (2000)
Michael Landon, the Father I Knew (1999 TV)
Michael Lucas' Dangerous Liaisons (2005)
Michael & Me (2004)
Michael Moore Hates America (2004)
Miche (1932)
Michel Strogoff: (1926, 1936 & 1956)
Michel Vaillant (2003)
The Michelle Apartments (1995)
Michiel de Ruyter (2015)
The Michigan Kid: (1928 & 1947)
Michurin (1948)
Mickey: (1918, 1948 & 2004)
Mickey 17 (2024)
Mickey and the Bear (2019)
Mickey Blue Eyes (1999)
Mickey Matson and the Copperhead Conspiracy (2012)
Mickey One (1965)
Mickey's series:
Mickey's Christmas Carol (1983)
Mickey's House of Villains (2002)
Mickey's Magical Christmas: Snowed in at the House of Mouse (2001)
Mickey's Once Upon a Christmas (1999) (TV)
Mickey's Polo Team (1936)
Mickey's Trailer (1938)
Mickey's Twice Upon a Christmas (2004)
Mickey, Donald, Goofy: The Three Musketeers (2004)
Micki & Maude (1984)
Mickybo and Me (2004)
Micmacs (2009)
The Microbe (1919)
Microbe & Gasoline (2015)
Microcosmos (1996)
Microhabitat (2017)
Microphone (2010)
Microwave Massacre (1979)
Mid-Afternoon Barks (2007)
Mid-July Days (2015)
Mid-July Days 2 (2016)
Mid90s (2018)
The Midas Touch: (1940, 1997 & 2013)
Middle Age Crazy (1980)
MiddleMen (2009)
The Middle Watch: (1930 & 1940)
The Middle of the World: (1974 & 2003)
The Middleton Family at the New York World's Fair (1939)
Midnight: (1918, 1922, 1931, 1934, 1939, 1949, 1982, 1989, 1998 & 2021)
The Midnight Adventure (1928)
The Midnight After (2014)
The Midnight Alarm (1923)
The Midnight Cabaret (1923)
A Midnight Clear (1992)
Midnight Club (1933)
Midnight Cowboy (1969)
The Midnight Drives (2007)
Midnight Express (1978)
The Midnight Express (1924)
The Midnight Flyer (1918)
The Midnight Game (2013)
Midnight Garage (2014)
The Midnight Ghost (1940)
The Midnight Girl (1925)
The Midnight Guest (1923)
Midnight Hair (2014)
The Midnight Hour (1985 TV)
Midnight in the Garden of Good and Evil (1997)
The Midnight Kiss (1926)
Midnight Lace (1960)
The Midnight Lady (1932)
Midnight Madness (1980)
Midnight Man (1995)
The Midnight Man: (1917, 1919, 1974, 2016 crime & 2016 horror)
The Midnight Meat Train (2008)
The Midnight Message (1926)
Midnight Movie (2009)
Midnight My Love (2005)
Midnight in Paris (2011)
Midnight Rider (unreleased)
Midnight Run (1988)
The Midnight Sky (2020)
The Midnight Story (1957)
The Midnight Swim (2014)
Midnight in the Switchgrass (2021)
Midnight Whisper (2015)
Midsommar (2019)
Midsommer (2003)
Midsummer Dream (2005)
A Midsummer Night's Dream: (1909, 1935, 1959, 1968, 1999, 2016 & 2017)
A Midsummer Night's Sex Comedy (1982)
Midway: (1976 & 2019)
A Midwinter's Tale (1995)

Mif-Mim

Mifune (1999)
Mifune: The Last Samurai (2015)
The Mighty (1998)
Mighty Aphrodite (1995)
The Mighty Celt (2005)
The Mighty Ducks series:
The Mighty Ducks (1992)
D2: The Mighty Ducks (1994)
D3: The Mighty Ducks (1996)
A Mighty Heart (2007)
Mighty Joe Young: (1949 & 1998)
Mighty Like a Moose (1926)
Mighty Morphin Power Rangers: The Movie (1995)
A Mighty Wind (2003)
The Mikado: (1939 & 1967)
Mike Bassett: England Manager (2001)
Mike and Dave Need Wedding Dates (2015)
Mike Wallace Is Here (2019)
Mike's New Car (2002)
Mikey (1992)
Mikey and Nicky (1976)
Mil Mascaras vs. the Aztec Mummy (2007)
Milae (2002)
The Milagro Beanfield War (1988)
Milan: (1946, 1967, 1995 & 2004)
Milano calibro 9 (1972)
Mildred Pierce (1945)
Mile Zero (2001)
Miles of Fire (1957)
Miley: The Movement (2013)
Mili: (1975 & 2015)
Milk: (2008 American, 2008 Turkish, 2017 & 2021)
Milk Money (1994)
Milka – A Film About Taboos (1980)
The Milker's Mishap (1897)
The Milky Way: (1936, 1940 & 1969)
Milky Way Liberation Front (2007)
The Mill and the Cross (2011)
The Mill on the Floss (1936)
Mill of the Stone Women (1960)
Millennium (1989)
Millennium Actress (2001)
Millennium Mambo (2001)
The Miller and the Sweep (1898)
Miller's Crossing (1990)
Le Million (1931)
Million Dollar Arm (2014)
Million Dollar Baby: (1941 & 2004)
The Million Dollar Hotel (2000)
Million Dollar Mermaid (1952)
Million Dollar Mystery (1927)
Million Dollar Mystery (1987)
The Million Eyes of Sumuru (1967)
A Million Little Pieces (2018)
The Million Ryo Pot (1935)
A Million Ways to Die in the West (2014)
The Millionaire: (1917, 1921, 1927, 1931, 1947 & 1950)
Millionaires Express (1986)
Millions: (1937 & 2004)
Milou in May (1990)
The Mimic: (2017 & 2020)
Mimic series:
Mimic (1997)
Mimic 2 (2001)
Mimic 3: Sentinel (2003)

Min-Mix

Min & Max (2016)
Min and Bill (1930)
Mina Kiá (2017)
Mina olin siin (2008)
Minari (2020)
Mind Game (2004)
Mindhunters (2004)
Minding the Gap (2018)
Mine 9 (2019)
Minghags: The Movie (2009)
Mini's First Time (2006)
Minions (2015)
Minions: The Rise of Gru (2022)
Ministry of Fear (1944)
The Miniver Story (1950)
Minnale (2001)
Minnalppadayaali (1959)
Minnesota Clay (1965)
Minnie and Moskowitz (1972)
Minority Report (2002)
Minotaur (2006)
Minotaur, the Wild Beast of Crete (1960)
Minsaara Kanavu (1997)
Minshū no Teki (1946)
The Minus Man (1999)
A Minute to Pray, a Second to Die (1968)
The Minute You Wake Up Dead (2022)
Minutes to Midnight (2018)
Mio in the Land of Faraway (1987)
Miracle: (1982 & 2004)
The Miracle: (1912 German, 1912 UK, 1913, 1959, 1987, 1991, 2009, 2013, 2015 & 2021)
Miracle on 1st Street (2007)
Miracle on 34th Street: (1947 & 1994)
The Miracle of the Bells (1948)
The Miracle of Bern (2003)
Miracle on Ice (1981)
The Miracle of Joe Petrel (1984)
Miracle in Lane 2 (2000 TV)
The Miracle Man: (1919 & 1932)
The Miracle Match (2005)
Miracle in Milan (1951)
Miracle Mile (1988)
The Miracle of Morgan's Creek (1943)
The Miracle of Our Lady of Fatima (1952)
The Miracle Season (2018)
Miracle at St. Anna (2008)
The Miracle Worker: (1962, 1979 & 2000)
Miracles: (1986 & 1989)
Miracles from Heaven (2016)
Mirage: (1965, 1972, 1995, 2004 & 2014)
The Mirage: (1920 & 2015)
Mirai (2018)
Miranda: (1948, 1985 & 2002)
Mirch Masala (1985)
Mirror (1975)
The Mirror: (1913, 1915, 1917, 1943, 1967, 1999, 2014 & 2015)
The Mirror Crack'd (1980)
The Mirror Has Two Faces (1996)
Mirror Mirror (2012)
Mirror, Mirror (1990)
MirrorMask (2005)
Mirrors: (1978, 2007 & 2008)
Mirzya (2016)
Misbegotten (1997)
Mischief: (1931 & 1985)
Mischief Night: (2006, 2013 & 2014)
Mise Éire (1959)
The MisEducation of Bindu (2019)
The Miseducation of Cameron Post (2018)
The Miser: (1908 & 1990)
Les Misérables: (1909, 1917, 1925, 1934, 1935, 1948, 1952, 1958, 1978, 1982, 1995, 1998 & 2012)
Misery (1990)
Misfit (2017)
The Misfits: (1961, 2011 & 2021)
Misha and the Wolves (2021)
Mishima: A Life in Four Chapters (1995)
Miss America (2002)
Miss Americana (2020)
Miss Bala: (2011 & 2019)
Miss Congeniality (2000)
Miss Congeniality 2: Armed and Fabulous (2005)
Miss Gold Digger (2007)
Miss Jerry (1894)
Miss Julie: (1951, 1999 & 2014)
Miss Juneteenth (2020)
Miss Lovely (2012)
Miss Lulu Bett (1922)
Miss March (2009)
Miss Meadows (2014)
Miss Mend (1926)
Miss Peregrine's Home for Peculiar Children (2016)
Miss Pettigrew Lives for a Day (2008)
Miss Potter (2006)
Miss Sloane (2016)
Miss Stevens (2016)
Miss Suwanna of Siam (1923)
Miss You Already (2015)
Missile to the Moon (1958)
Missing: (1918, 1982, 2008, 2016 & 2018)
The Missing: (1999, 2003, 2017 & 2020)
Missing in Action (1984)
Missing in Action 2: The Beginning (1985)
Missing in America (2005)
Missing Link (2019)
The Missing Link: (1927 & 1980)
The Missing Links (1916)
The Missing Person (2009)
The Missing Picture (2013)
The Missing Piece (2015)
Missing You: (2008 & 2016)
The Mission: (1983, 1986 & 1999)
Mission to Mars (2000)
Mission Stardust (1967)
Mission: Impossible series:
Mission: Impossible (1996)
Mission: Impossible 2 (2000)
Mission: Impossible III (2006)
Mission: Impossible – Ghost Protocol (2011)
Mission: Impossible – Rogue Nation (2015)
Mission: Impossible – Fallout (2018)
Mission: Impossible – Dead Reckoning Part One (2023)
Mission: Impossible – Dead Reckoning Part Two (2024)
Mission Milano (2016)
Mission: Possible (2021)
The Missionary (1982)
Missionary (2013)
Mississippi Burning (1988)
Mississippi Gambler (1942)
The Mississippi Gambler: (1929 & 1953)
Mississippi Grind (2015)
Mississippi Masala (1991)
Mississippi Mermaid (1969)
The Missouri Breaks (1976)
The Mist (2007)
Mister (2017)
Mister 880 (1950)
Mister Bug Goes to Town (1941)
Mister Felicità (2017)
Mister Quilp (1975)
Mister Roberts: (1955 & 1984 TV)
Les Mistons (1957)
Mistress: (1987 TV & 1992)
The Mistress: (1927, 1962 & 2012)
Mistress America (2015)
The Mistress of Spices (2005)
The Mistress of Treves (1952)
Misty (1961)
Mitchell (1975)
The Mitchells vs. the Machines (2021)
Mixed Nuts (1994)
Mixtape (2021)

Mo

Mo: (2010 TV & 2016)
Mo Dil To Deewana (2013)
Mo Duniya Tu Hi Tu (2013)
Mo' Better Blues (1990)
Mo' Money (1992)

Moa-Mol

Moan and Groan, Inc. (1929)
Moana: (1926 & 2016)
Mob Boss (1990)
Mob Queen (1998)
Mob Sister (2005)
Mob Story (1989)
Mob Town: (1941 & 2019)
Mobile Home (2012)
Mobile Homes (2017)
Mobsters (1991)
Moby Dick: (1930, 1956, 1978 & 2010)
Moby Doc (2021)
Mock Up on Mu (2008)
Mockery: (1912 & 1927)
Mockingbird (2014)
Mockingbird Don't Sing (2001)
Mod (2011)
The Mod Squad (1999)
Modada Mareyalli (1991)
Model Behavior (2000 TV)
Model Shop (1969)
Modern Boy (2008)
Modern Girls (1986)
Modern Life Is Rubbish (2017)
Modern Love: (1918, 1929, 1990 & 2006)
A Modern Marriage (1950)
A Modern Monte Cristo (1917)
A Modern Musketeer (1917)
Modern Problems (1981)
Modern Romance (1981)
Modern Times (1936)
Modern Vampires (1998)
Modesta (1956)
Modesty Blaise: (1966 & 1982)
Modigliani (2004)
Moebius: (1996 & 2013)
Moffie (2019)
Mogacho Anvddo (1950)
Mogadischu (2008 TV)
Mogam Muppadhu Varusham (1976)
Mogambo (1953)
Mogliamante (1977)
Mogra Phulaalaa (2019)
Moguds Pellams (2005)
Mogudu (2011)
Mogudu Kaavali (1980)
Mogudu Pellam O Dongodu (2005)
The Moguls (2005)
Mohabbatein (2000)
Mohammad, Messenger of God (1976)
Mojados: Through the Night (2004)
Mojin: The Lost Legend (2015)
Mojin: The Worm Valley (2018)
The Mole Agent (2020)
The Mole People (1956)
Moll Flanders (1996)
Molly & Gina (1994)
The Molly Maguires (1970)
Molly's Game (2017)
Moloch (1999)

Mom

Mom (2017)
Mom and Dad: (1945 & 2017)
Mom and Dad Save the World (1992)
Mom and Other Loonies in the Family (2015)
Mom and the Red Bean Cake (2010)
Mom at Sixteen (2005)
Mom Thinks I'm Crazy to Marry a Japanese Guy (2017)
Mom's Got a Date with a Vampire (2000) (TV)
Mom's Outta Sight (1998)
Mom's on Strike (2002)
Mome Ki Gudiya (1972)
Moment (1978)
The Moment: (1979 & 2013)
Moment of Danger (1960)
Moment of Impact (1998)
Moment of Indiscretion (1958)
A Moment of Innocence (1996)
Moment by Moment (1978)
Moment to Moment (1966)
A Moment to Remember (2004)
The Moment of Truth: (1952 & 1965)
Momentum: (1992, 2001 & 2003 TV)
Momijigari (1899)
Momma Don't Allow (1956)
Mommaga (1997)
Mommie Dearest (1981)
Mommo the Bogeyman (2009)
Mommy: (1995 & 2014) 
Momo: (1986 & 2001)
Momotaro's Divine Sea Warriors (1945)
Momotaro's Sea Eagles (1943)
Moms (2012)
Moms at War (2018)
Moms' Night Out (2014)
Momzillas (2013)

Mon

Mon île était le monde (1992)
Mon Mon Mon Monsters (2017)
Mon Oncle (1958)
Mon oncle d'Amérique (1980)
Mon oncle Antoine (1971)
Mon oncle Benjamin (1969)
Mona Lisa (1986)
Mona Lisa and the Blood Moon (2021)
Mona Lisa Smile (2003)
The Monastery of Sendomir (1920)
Monday Morning (2002)
Mondays in the Sun (2002)
Mondo Cane (1962)
Mondo New York (1988)
Mondo Topless (1966)
Mondo Trasho (1969)
Mondovino (2004)
Money from Home (1953)
Money for Nothing: (1932 & 1993)
Money Game (2015)
Money Money (1994)
Money Movers (1978)
The Money Pit (1986)
Money Talks: (1926, 1932, 1972 & 1997)
Money Train (1995)
Moneyball (2011)
Mongol: The Rise of Genghis Khan (2007)
A Mongolian Tale (1995)
Monk with a Camera (2014)
Monk Comes Down the Mountain (2015)
Monk Dawson (1998)
Monkey Business: (1931 & 1952)
The Monkey King series:
The Monkey King (2014)
The Monkey King 2 (2016)
The Monkey King 3 (2018)
Monkey King: Hero Is Back (2015)
Monkey Shines (1988)
Monkeybone (2001)
Monkeyshines (1889)
Monolith (2016)
The Monolith Monsters (1957)
Mononoke Hime (1997)
Monos (2019)
Monrak Transistor (2001)
Monsieur Beaucaire: (1924 & 1946)
Monsieur Hire (1990)
Monsieur Hulot's Holiday (1954)
Monsieur Ibrahim (2003)
Monsieur Klein (1976)
Monsieur Lazhar (2011)
Monsieur N. (2003)
Monsieur Verdoux (1947)
Monsieur Vincent (1947)
Monsoon: (1952, 2014, 2015 & 2019)
Monsoon Mangoes (2016)
The Monsoon Oracle (2013)
Monsoon Raaga (2022)
Monsoon Shootout (2013)
Monsoon Wedding (2001)
Monster: (2003, 2008, 2014, 2018, 2019 & 2022)
The Monster: (1925, 1954, 1994 & 2016)
Monster in a Box (1992)
A Monster Calls (2016)
Monster on the Campus (1958)
The Monster Club (1981)
Monster Dog (1984)
Monster Family (2018)
Monster from Green Hell (1958)
Monster High (1989)
Monster High series:
Monster High: Fright On! (2011)
Monster High: Escape from Skull Shores (2012)
Monster High: Friday Night Frights (2012)
Monster High: Boo York, Boo York (2015)
Monster High: The Movie (2022)
Monster House (2006)
Monster Hunt (2015)
Monster Hunt 2 (2018)
Monster Hunter (2020)
Monster Man (2005)
Monster Mash: (1995 & 2000)
Monster from the Ocean Floor (1954)
The Monster of Phantom Lake (2006)
The Monster of Piedras Blancas (1959)
Monster from a Prehistoric Planet (1967)
The Monster Squad (1987)
Monster Strike The Movie (2016)
The Monster That Challenged the World (1957)
A Monster with a Thousand Heads (2015)
Monster Trucks (2017)
Monster's Ball (2001)
Monster-in-Law (2005)
Monsters: (2004, 2010 & 2015)
Monsters. (2019)
Monsters Crash the Pajama Party (1965)
Monsters University (2013)
Monsters vs Aliens (2009)
Monsters: Dark Continent (2014)
Monsters, Inc. (2001)
Monsterz (2014)
Monstrosity (1964)
Monstrum (2018)
Montana: (1950, 1990 TV, 1998, 2014 & 2017)
Montana Story (2021)
Montauk Chronicles (2014)
Monte Carlo: (1921, 1925, 1926, 1930 & 2011)
Monte Carlo or Bust! (1969)
Monte Cristo: (1922 & 1929)
Monterey Pop (1968)
A Month in the Country (1987)
A Month of Sundays: (2001 & 2015)
Montparnasse 19 (1958)
Monty Python series:
Monty Python and the Holy Grail (1975)
Monty Python Live at the Hollywood Bowl (1982)
Monty Python's Life of Brian (1979)
Monty Python's The Meaning of Life (1983)
Monument Ave. (1998)
The Monuments Men (2014)

Moo-Moz

Mood Indigo (2013)
Moog (2004)
Moon: (2009 & 2020)
Moon 44 (1990)
The Moon Is Blue (1953)
Moon Child: (1989 & 2003)
The Moon in the Gutter (1983)
The Moon of Israel (1924)
Moon Man: (2012 & 2022)
Moon Over Miami (1941)
Moon Over Parador (1988)
The Moon and the Sledgehammer (1971)
Moon of the Wolf (1972 TV)
Moon Zero Two (1969)
The Moon-Spinners (1964)
Moonage Daydream (2022)
Moonbeam Magic (1924)
Moonfall (2022)
Moonfleet (1955)
Moonlight: (2002 & 2016)
Moonlight Mile (2002)
Moonlight and Valentino (1995)
Moonlight Whispers (1999)
Moonlighting (1982)
Moonraker (1979)
Moonrise (1948)
Moonrise Kingdom (2012)
Moonrunners (1975)
The Moonshine War (1970)
The Moonshiners (1916)
Moonstruck (1987)
Moontrap (1989)
Moonwalker (1988)
Moosa Khan (2002)
Morbius (2022)
More: (1969 & 1998)
More American Graffiti (1979)
The More the Merrier (1943)
More than Blue (2009)
More than Famous (2003)
Morgan: (2012 & 2016)
Morgan - A Suitable Case for Treatment (1966)
Morgan Stewart's Coming Home (1987)
Morgenrot (1933)
Morgiana (1972)
Morituri: (1948 & 1965)
The Morning After: (1974 TV & 1986)
Morning Glory: (1933 & 2010)
Morning Patrol (1987)
Morocco (1930)
Mortal Engines (2018)
The Mortal Instruments: City of Bones (2013)
Mortal Kombat series:
Mortal Kombat: (1995 & 2021)
Mortal Kombat: Annihilation (1997)
The Mortal Storm (1940)
Mortal Thoughts (1991)
Mortuary: (1983 & 2005)
Morvern Callar (2002)
The Mortuary Collection (2019)
Mosaic (2007)
Moscow Does Not Believe in Tears (1979)
Moscow on the Hudson (1984)
Moses (1995)
The Mosquito Coast (1986)
Moss Rose (1947)
The Most Beautiful Couple (2018)
The Most Beautiful Couple in the World (1968)
The Most Dangerous Game (1932)
The Most Hated Woman in America (2017)
A Most Violent Year (2014)
Most Wanted: (1997 & 2011)
Mostly Martha (2001)
Motel Hell (1980)
The Motel Life (2012)
The Moth Diaries (2011)
Mother: (1910, 1914, 1926, 1937, 1951, 1952, 1955, 1963, 1985, 1990, 1996, 1999 Indian, 1999 Russian, 2009, 2014, 2016 Estonian, 2016 Georgian & 2019)
The Mother (2003)
mother! (2017)
Mother/Android (2021)
Mother and Child (2010)
Mother of George (2013)
Mother Goose Melodies (1931)
Mother Holly (1954)
Mother India (1957)
Mother Joan of the Angels (1961)
Mother of Mine (2005)
Mother Night (1996)
Mother Schmuckers (2021)
A Mother Should be Loved (1934)
Mother of Tears (2007)
The Mother and the Whore (1973)
Mother's Day: (1980, 2010, & 2016)
A Mother's Prayer (1995)
Mother, Jugs & Speed (1976)
Mother, Mother, Mother Pin a Rose on Me (1924)
Motherhood: (1917 & 2009)
Mothering Sunday (2021)
Motherless Brooklyn (2019)
Mothers & Daughters: (2004 & 2008)
Mothers and Daughters (2016)
Mothers' Instinct (TBD)
Mothman (2010 TV)
The Mothman Prophecies (2002)
Mothra (1961)
Mothra vs. Godzilla (1964)
Motion Painting No. 1 (1947)
The Motorcycle Diaries (2004)
Motorpsycho (1965)
Mouchette (1967)
Moulin Rouge: (1952 & 2001)
Mountain: (2015 & 2017)
The Mountain: (1956, 1991, 2012 & 2018)
The Mountain Between Us (2017)
The Mountain of the Cannibal God (1979)
Mountain Cry (2015)
The Mountain Eagle (1926)
Mountain Family Robinson (1979)
The Mountain Road (1960)
Mountains May Depart (2015)
Mountains of the Moon (1990)
Mourning Becomes Electra (1947)
The Mourning Forest (2007)
Mouse Menace (1946)
The Mouse That Roared (1959)
MouseHunt (1997)
La Moustache (2005)
The Mouth of the Wolf: (1988 & 2009)
A Mouthful of Air (2021)
The Mouthpiece (1932)
Move Over, Darling (1963)
A Movie (1958)
Movie 43 (2013)
Movie Crazy (1932)
Movie Critters' Big Picture (2003)
Moving: (1988 & 1993)
Moving Malcolm (2003)
Moving Violation (1976)
Moving Violations (1985)
Mowgli: Legend of the Jungle (2018)
Moxie (2021)
Mozart's Sister (2010)
Mozu (2015)

Mr–Mu

Mr. & Mrs. '55 (1955)
Mr. & Mrs. Smith: (1941 & 2005)
Mr. 3000 (2004)
Mr. Arkadin (1955)
Mr. Baseball (1992)
Mr. Bean's Holiday (2007)
Mr. Black: Green Star (2015)
Mr. Blandings Builds His Dream House (1948)
Mr. Brooks (2007)
Mr. Bug Goes to Town (1941)
Mr. Butterfly (2003)
Mr. Church (2016)
Mr. Death: The Rise and Fall of Fred A. Leuchter, Jr. (2000)
Mr. Deeds (2002)
Mr. Deeds Goes to Town (1936)
Mr. Destiny (1990)
Mr. Donkey (2016)
Mr. Freedom (1969)
Mr. Harrigan's Phone (2022)
Mr. High Heels (2016)
Mr. Hobbs Takes a Vacation (1962)
Mr. Holland's Opus (1995)
Mr. Jealousy (1997)
Mr. Klein (1976)
Mr. Lucky (1943)
Mr. Magoo (1997)
Mr. Magoo's Christmas Carol (1962) (TV)
Mr. Magorium's Wonder Emporium (2007)
Mr. Majestyk (1974)
Mr. Mike's Mondo Video (1979)
Mr. Mom (1983)
Mr. Morgan's Last Love (2013)
Mr. and Mrs. Iyer (2002)
Mr. and Mrs. Khiladi (1997)
Mr. Nian (2016)
Mr. Nice Guy: (1987 & 1997)
Mr. Nobody (2009)
Mr. Peabody and the Mermaid (1948)
Mr. Peabody & Sherman (2014)
Mr. Popper's Penguins (2011)
Mr. Reliable (1996)
Mr. Right: (2009 & 2015)
Mr. Sardonicus (1962)
Mr. Saturday Night (1992)
Mr. Skeffington (1944)
Mr. Smith Goes to Washington (1939)
Mr. Topaze (1961)
Mr. Turner (2014)
Mr. Vampire series:
Mr. Vampire (1985)
Mr. Vampire II (1986)
Mr. Vampire III (1987)
Mr. Vampire IV (1988)
Mr. Vampire 1992 (1992)
Mr. Woodcock (2007)
Mr. Wrong (1996)
Mr. Zhao (1998)
Mrityudata (1997)
Mrs Dalloway (1997)
Mrs Henderson Presents (2005)
Mrs. Brown (1997)
Mrs. Brown's Boys D'Movie (2014)
Mrs. Doubtfire (1993)
Mrs. Harris (2005) (TV)
Mrs. Harris Goes to Paris (2022)
Mrs. Miniver (1942)
Mrs. Palfrey at the Claremont (2008)
Mrs. Parker and the Vicious Circle (1994)
Mrs. Santa Claus (1996) (TV)
Mrs. Winterbourne (1996)
Ms. 45 (1981)
Mt. Tsurugidake (2009)
Much Ado About Nothing: (1973, 1993, 2012 & 2016)
Mud: (1997 & 2012)
Mudbound (2017)
Mudhoney (1965)
El Muerto (2005)
Mug Travel (2007)
Mugavari (2000)
Mughal-e-Azam (1960)
Muhwagwa (1935)
La mujer de mi hermano (2005)
Mujhe Chand Chahiye (2000)
Mujhse Dosti Karoge! (2002)
Mujhse Shaadi Karogi (2004)
Mulan: (1998, 2009 & 2020)
Mulan II (2005)
Mulan Joins the Army: (1928 & 1939)
The Mule: (2014 & 2018)
Mulholland Drive (2001)
Mulholland Falls (1996)
Mulk (2018)
Mullet (2001)
Multi-Facial (1994)
Multiple Maniacs (1970)
Multiple Sidosis (1970)
Multiplicity (1996)
Mum & Dad (2008)
Mumbai Diaries (2011)
Mumford (1999)
The Mummy series:
The Mummy: (1932, 1999 & 2017)
The Mummy Returns (2001)
The Mummy: Tomb of the Dragon Emperor (2008)
The Mummy's Curse (1944)
The Mummy's Ghost (1944)
The Mummy's Hand (1940)
The Mummy's Tomb (1942)
Munchausen (2013)
Münchhausen (1943)
Munchies (1987)
Munich: (2005 & 2021)
Munna Bhai M.B.B.S. (2003)
The Munsters series:
Munster, Go Home! (1966)
The Mini-Munsters (1973) (TV)
The Munsters' Revenge (1981) (TV)
Here Come the Munsters (1995) (TV)
The Munsters' Scary Little Christmas (1996) (TV)
The Munsters (2022)
Muoi: The Legend of a Portrait (2007)
The Muppets series:
The Muppets (2011)
Muppet Classic Theater (1994)
The Muppet Christmas Carol (1992)
A Muppet Family Christmas (1987) (TV)
Muppets Most Wanted (2014)
The Muppet Movie (1979)
Muppets from Space (1999)
The Muppets Take Manhattan (1984)
Muppet Treasure Island (1996)
The Muppets' Wizard of Oz (2005) (TV)
Murder (2020)
Murder! (1930)
Murder series:
Murder (2004)
Murder 2 (2011)
Murder 3 (2013)
Murder at 1600 (1997)
Murder Ahoy (1964)
A Murder Beside Yanhe River (2014)
Murder in a Blue World (1973)
A Murder of Crows (1999)
Murder on D Street (1998)
Murder at Dawn (1932)
Murder by Death (1976)
Murder by Decree (1979)
Murder in the Big House (1942)
Murder in the First (1995)
Murder at the Gallop (1963)
Murder in the Heartland (1993)
Murder at Honeymoon Hotel (2016)
Murder Most Foul (1964)
Murder Is My Beat (1955)
Murder Mystery (2019)
Murder by Numbers (2002)
Murder Obsession (1981)
Murder One (1988)
Murder on the Orient Express: (1974, 2001 TV & 2017)
Murder in Pacot (2014)
A Murder in the Park (2014)
Murder by Phone (1982)
Murder in a Small Town (1999) (TV)
Murder at the Vanities (1934)
Murder, My Sweet (1944)
Murder-Set-Pieces (2004)
Murderball (2005)
The Murderer Lives at Number 21 (1942)
Murderers' Row (1966)
Murderous Maids (2000)
Murders in the Rue Morgue: (1932 & 1971)
Muriel, or the Time of a Return (1963)
Muriel's Wedding (1994)
Murina (2021)
Murmur of the Heart (1971)
Murmur of the Hearts (2015)
Murphy's Law (1986)
Murphy's Romance (1985)
Murphy's War (1971)
Musa (2001)
Musafir: (1940, 1957, 2004, 2013 & 2016)
Musashi Miyamoto (1954)
Muscle Tussle (1953)
The Muse (1999)
Museum Hours (2012)
Mushrooming (2012)
Music: (2008 & 2021)
The Music (1972)
Music in the Air (1934)
Music from Another Room (1998)
Music Box (1989)
The Music Box (1932)
The Music of Chance (1993)
Music of the Heart (1999)
The Music Lovers (1971)
Music and Lyrics (2007)
The Music Man: (1962 & 2003 TV)
The Music Room (1958)
Musical Varieties (1948)
The Musketeer (2001)
The Musketeers of Pig Alley (1912)
Must Love Dogs (2005)
The Mustang (2019)
Mutant Aliens (2001)
Mutant Chronicles (2009)
Mute: (2005 & 2018)
Mute Witness (1995)
Muthu (1995)
The Mutilator (1984)
Mutiny on the Bounty: (1935 & 1962)
Mutual Appreciation (2005)

Mv

MVP 2: Most Vertical Primate (2002)
MVP: Most Valuable Primate (2000)

My

My 20th Century (1989)
My American Cousin (1985)
My American Uncle (1980)
My American Wife: (1922 & 1936)
My Architect (2003)
My Autograph (2006)
My Baby's Daddy (2004)
My Beautiful Girl, Mari (2002)
My Beautiful Laundrette (1985)
My Best Fiend (1999)
My Best Friend: (2001, 2006 & 2018)
My Best Friend Is a Vampire (1988)
My Best Friend's Birthday (1987)
My Best Friend's Exorcism (2022)
My Best Friend's Girl: (1983 & 2008)
My Best Friend's Wedding: (1997 & 2016)
My Big Fat Greek Wedding (2002)
My Blood Runs Cold (1965)
My Bloody Valentine (1981)
My Bloody Valentine 3D (2009)
My Blue Heaven (1990)
My Blueberry Nights (2007)
My Bodyguard (1980)
My Boss's Daughter (2003)
My Boss, My Hero (2001)
My Boss, My Teacher (2006)
My Boyfriend is Type B (2005)
My Boyfriend's Back (1993)
My Brilliant Career (1979)
My Brother's Wedding (1983)
My Bunny Lies Over the Sea (1948)
My Chauffeur (1986)
My Cousin Rachel: (1952 & 2017)
My Cousin Vinny (1992)
My Darling Clementine (1946)
My Date with Drew (2005)
My Date with the President's Daughter (1998) (TV)
My Daughter’s Killer (documentary) (2022)
My Dinner with Andre (1981)
My Dog Skip (2000)
My Donkey, My Lover & I (2020)
My Fair Lady (1964)
My Family (1995)
My Father the Hero: (1991 & 1994)
My Father Is a Hero (1995)
My Father's Glory (1991)
My Favorite Brunette (1947)
My Favorite Martian (1999)
My Favorite Season (1993)
My Favorite Spy: (1942 & 1951)
My Favorite Wife (1940)
My Favorite Year (1982)
My Fellow Americans (1996)
My Feral Heart (2016)
My First Mister (2001)
My Foolish Heart: (1949 & 2018)
My Friend Dahmer (2017)
My Friend Flicka (1943)
My Friend Irma (1949)
My Friend Irma Goes West (1950)
My Friend, Kolka! (1961)
My Geeky Nerdy Buddies (2014)
My Geisha (1962)
My Giant (1998)
My Girl (1991)
My Girl 2 (1994)
My Gun Is Quick (1957)
My Hawaiian Discovery (2014)
My Heart Belongs to Daddy (1942)
My Hero: (1912 & 1990)
My Heroes Have Always Been Cowboys (1991)
My Last Day (2011)
My Learned Friend (1943)
My Left Eye Sees Ghosts (2002)
My Left Foot (1989)
My Life (1993)
My Life in Cinemascope (2004)
My Life as a Courgette (2016)
My Life as a Dog (1985)
My Life on Ice (2002)
My Life for Ireland (1941)
My Life to Live (1962)
My Life for Maria Isabella (1935)
My Life as McDull (2001)
My Life in Pink (1997)
My Life in Ruins (2009)
My Life So Far (1999)
My Life Without Me (2003)
My Little Chickadee (1940)
My Little Eye (2002)
My Little Hero (2013)
My Little Pony series:
My Little Pony: The Movie: (1986 & 2017)
My Little Pony: The Princess Promenade (2006)
My Little Pony: A Very Minty Christmas (2005)
My Little Pony: Equestria Girls (2013)
My Little Sister: (1919 & 2020)
My Love: (1970, 2006 & 2007)
My Love Story!! (2015)
My Lover My Son (1970)
My Lucky Star: (1933, 1938, 2003 & 2013)
My Lucky Stars (1985)
My Man: (1924, 1928, 1996 & 2014)
My Man Godfrey (1936)
My Man and I (1952)
My Mighty Princess (2008)
My Mother, the Mermaid (2004)
My Name Is Bill W. (1989)
My Name Is Bruce (2007)
My Name Is Joe (1998)
My Name Is Julia Ross (1945)
My Name Is Khan (2010)
My Name Is Modesty (2003)
My Name Is Nobody (1973)
My Name Is Pecos (1967)
My Neighbor Totoro (1988)
My Neighbors the Yamadas (1999)
My New Partner (1985)
My New Sassy Girl (2015)
My Night at Maud's (1969)
My Night with Reg (1996)
My Nights Are More Beautiful Than Your Days (1989)
My Octopus Teacher (2020)
My Old Kentucky Home: (1922, 1926 & 1938)
My Old School: (2013 & 2022)
My One and Only (2009)
My Original Dream (2015)
My Own Love Song (2010)
My Own Private Idaho (1991)
My Own Swordsman (2011)
My Policeman (2022)
My Salinger Year (2020)
My Sassy Girl (2001)
My Sassy Girl 2 (2010)
My Scary Girl (2006)
My Science Project (1985)
My Second Brother (1959)
My Side of the Mountain (1969)
My Sister Eileen: (1942 & 1955)
My Sister, My Love (1966)
My Sister's Keeper (2009)
My Six Convicts (1952)
My Son: (1925, 1928, 2007 & 2021)
My Son the Fanatic (1998)
My Son John (1952)
My Son, My Son, What Have Ye Done (2009)
My Sons (1991)
My Soul to Take (2010)
My Stepmother is an Alien (1988)
My Summer of Love (2004)
My Summer Story (1994)
My Super Ex-Girlfriend (2006)
My Sweet Audrina (2016)
My Sweet Little Village (1985)
My Teacher, Mr. Kim (2003)
My Teacher, My Obsession (2018)
My Tomorrow, Your Yesterday (2016)
My True Story (1951)
My Tutor (1983)
My Uncle (1958)
My Uncle Antoine (1971)
My Uncle Barbassous (1921)
My Uncle Benjamin: (1924 & 1969)
My Voyage to Italy (1999)
My War (2016)
My Way: (1973, 2011 & 2012)
My Week with Marilyn (2011)
My Wife Is an Actress (2001)
My Wife Is a Gangster (2001)
My Wife Is a Gangster 2 (2003)
My Wife Got Married (2008)
My Winnipeg (2007)
My Worst Nightmare (2011)

Mye-Myt

Myet Nu (2020)
Mylanchi Monchulla Veedu (2014)
Myna (2013)
Myna Has Gone (2008)
Mynaa (2010)
Mynarski Death Plummet (2014)
Mynatharuvi Kolakase (1967)
Myra Breckinridge (1970)
Myriad of Lights (1948)
Myself in the Distant Future (1997)
Mysteries of Lisbon (2010)
Mysteries of London (1915)
The Mysteries of Paris: (1922, 1935, 1943, 1957 & 1962)
The Mysteries of Pittsburgh (2008)
The Mysterious Dr. Fu Manchu (1929)
Mysterious Island: (1941, 1961, 2005 TV & 2011)
The Mysterious Island: (1905 & 1929)
Mysterious Island 2 (2013)
The Mysterious Miss C. (2002)
Mysterious Object at Noon (2000)
A Mysterious Portrait (1899)
Mysterious Skin (2004)
A Mysterious World (2011)
Mysterium Occupation (2004)
Mystery: (2012 & 2014)
Mystery Date (1991)
The Mystery of Death (2015)
The Mystery of Edwin Drood: (1935, 1993 & 2012 TV)
Mystery of Mamo (1978)
Mystery Mansion (1983)
Mystery Men (1999)
The Mystery of Picasso (1956)
The Mystery of Pine Creek Camp (1913)
Mystery Science Theater 3000: The Movie (1996)
Mystery Street (1950)
Mystery Train (1989)
Mystery of the Wax Museum (1933)
Mystery, Alaska (1999)
Mystic Pizza (1988)
Mystic River (2003)
Mystical Adventure (1988)
Mystify: Michael Hutchence (2019)
The Myth (2005)
The Myth of the American Sleepover (2010)
The Myth of Fingerprints (1997)
Mythos (1987)

Previous:  List of films: L    Next:  List of films: N–O

See also
 Lists of films
 Lists of actors
 List of film and television directors
 List of documentary films
 List of film production companies

-